= Henrique Alvim Corrêa =

Brazilian Illustrator

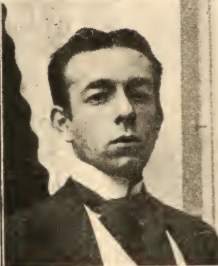
- Henrique Alvim Corrêa in 1896. Image from Jules Martin's Nos peintres et sculpteurs, Flammarion, 1898
- Born: 30 January 1876; Rio de Janeiro, Brazil
- Died: 7 July 1910 (aged 34); Brussels, Belgium
- Known for: Illustrations of H. G. Wells's The War of the Worlds
- Movement: Pre-Modernism

Henrique Alvim Corrêa (30 January 1876 – 7 July 1910) was a Brazilian illustrator of military and science fiction books. He was born in Rio de Janeiro, and died in Brussels. He is best known for his illustrations of a French translation of H. G. Wells's novel The War of the Worlds.

== Biography ==
=== Early life and education ===
Henrique Alvim Corrêa was born in Rio de Janeiro, Brazil, on 30 January 1876, the son of a prominent lawyer who died prematurely in 1883 and of the Baroness de Oliveira Castro. He went to live in Europe in 1892 at the age of sixteen, shortly after the proclamation of the Republic in Brazil, taken in by his stepfather, José Mendes de Oliveira Castro, the royalist Baron of Oliveira Castro.

He first arrived in Lisbon in 1892 and then in Paris in 1894 to study art under the painter Édouard Detaille. The following year, he attended the studio of Jean Jacques Brunet and participated for the first time in the Paris Salon. In 1897, the year of his stepfather's death, he began a series of studies for the execution of a large circular panorama entitled Cerco à Cidade de Paris (Siege of the City of Paris, a reference to the Paris Commune).

=== Marriage, career and death ===
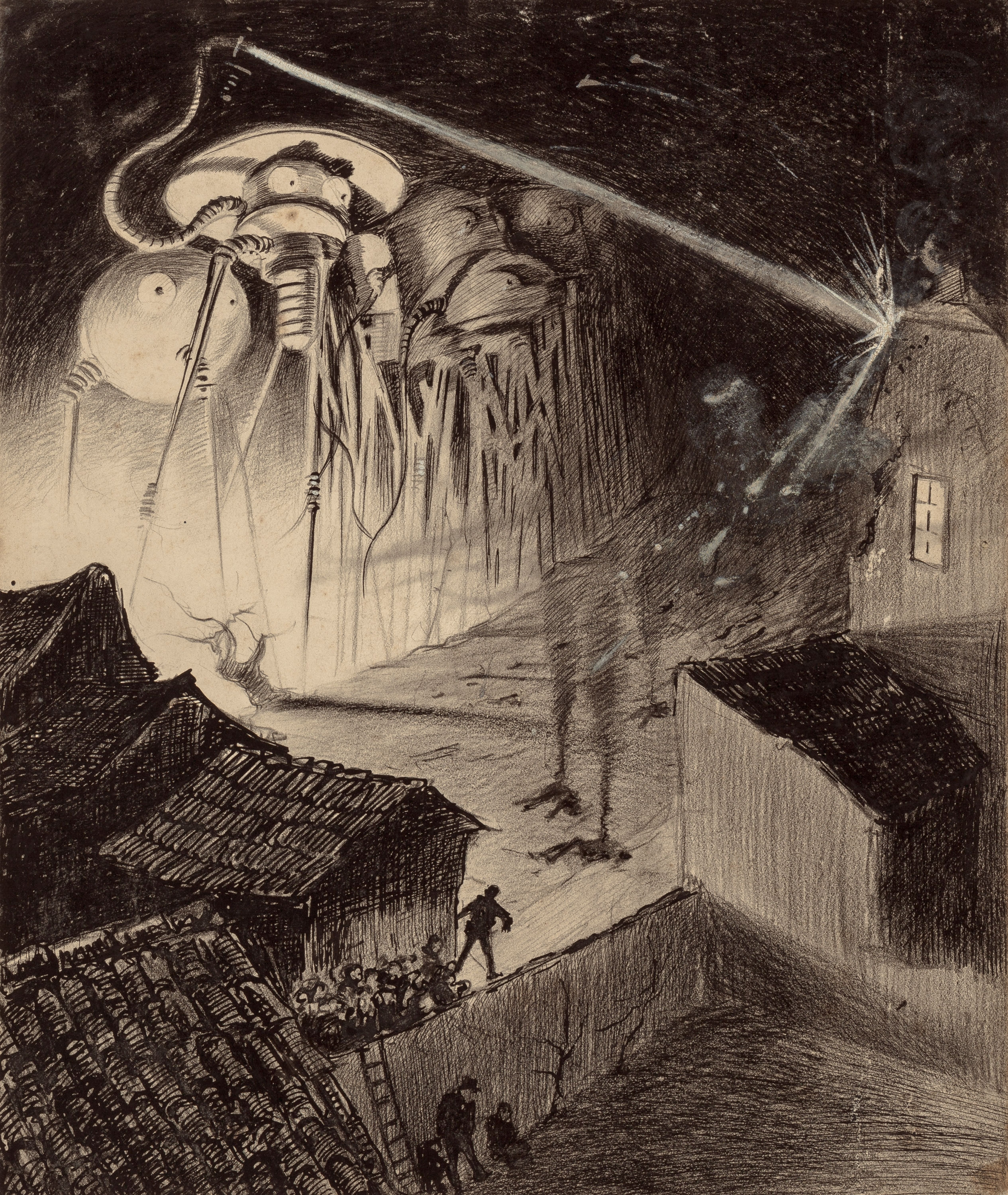
Illustration for a 1906 edition of H. G. Wells's 1898 The War of the Worlds

In 1900, against his family's wishes, he married Blanche Fernande Barbant, daughter of the French artist Charles Barbant. The couple moved to Brussels, where Corrêa opened his studio in 1900 in the Watermael-Boitsfort district, where he built a printing press. Despite financial hardship, this period proved to be his most productive.

In 1903, he executed a series of 132 notable illustrations, 32 of which were full-page plates inserted in the book The War of the Worlds, by H. G. Wells, to whom he personally requested authorization. Following the author's approval in 1905—who considered Corrêa's work superior to that of British illustrator Warwick Goble—his illustrations were published in a luxury edition printed in 500 copies in 1906 by L. Vandamme & Cie in a French translation by H.D. Davray. These illustrations constitute the highlight of his work. In Brazil, his work is generally classified as being Pre-Modernist.

Corrêa's broader oeuvre also included works depicting military life, particularly scenes from the Franco-Prussian War (1870–71). For financial reasons, he also produced a number of erotic drawings and engravings, under the pseudonym "Henri LeMort". In the composition of some of these works, his wife Blanche posed as a model.

He died in Brussels on 7 July 1910, at the age of 34, from tuberculosis, and his body was transferred to Brazil, being buried in Rio de Janeiro. He was the father of two children: Roberto Alvim Corrêa, a publisher and essayist who settled in Paris in the 1930s, and Eduardo Alvim Corrêa, a painter.

== Legacy ==
Much of Corrêa's work was lost or destroyed during the two world wars. In 1914, when Germany invaded Belgium during World War I, his studio was looted and several of his drawings were stolen or destroyed. In 1942, during World War II, some of his illustrations were lost when the ship that transported them to Brazil sank, torpedoed by a German submarine.

The Brazilian public only became aware of his work in the mid-1960s. The first public exhibition took place in 1972 at the São Paulo Museum of Art (MASP). Others would follow, such as those of 1977 and 1990, at the National Museum of Fine Arts, and that of 1981, at the Casa de Rui Barbosa Foundation, both in Rio de Janeiro. In 2004, his work was exhibited at the Science Fiction Museum (EMP Museum), in Seattle, USA, on the occasion of its inauguration. In 2016, his work was presented at the contemporary art exhibition Ulla, Ulla, Ulla! Martians, Aliens, Intergalactics and Humans curated by Jane de Almeida at the Casanova Gallery in São Paulo. In 1985, several of his engravings depicting nude and/or abused women were included in the book Baco e Anas brasileira, by the Goiás poet Yêda Schmaltz.

== Exhibitions ==
- 1972: São Paulo. Museu de Arte "Assis Chateaubriand" (MASP).
- 1973: Rio de Janeiro. Museu de Arte Moderna (MAM)
- 2001: Lisbon, Fondation Gulbenkian, "Século 20 Arte do Brasil".
- 2004–2007: Seattle, Science Fiction Museum and Hall of Fame (SFM).
- 2008–2009: Frankfurt, Darwin - Art and the Search for Origins.
- 2016: São Paulo, Casanova Art Space, "Ulla, Ulla, Ulla, Ulla! Martians, Aliens, Intergalactics and Humans"
