= The War of the Worlds =

1898 sci-fi novel by H. G. Wells

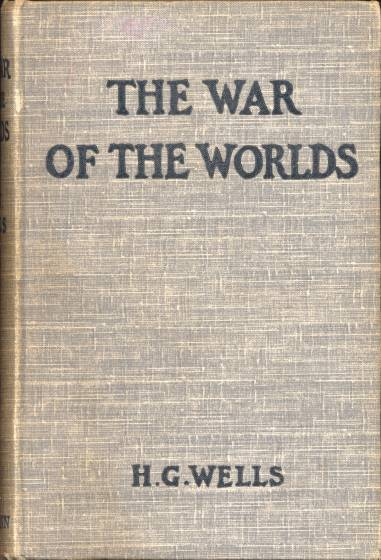
- 1898 UK first edition
- Author: H. G. Wells
- Illustrator: Warwick Goble
- Language: English
- Genre: Science fiction
- Publisher: William Heinemann (UK); Harper & Bros (US)
- Publication date: January 19, 1898
- Publication place: England
- Pages: 319
- Text: The War of the Worlds at Wikisource

The War of the Worlds, by H. G. Wells. LibriVox recording by Rebecca Dittman. Book 1, Chapter 1.

The War of the Worlds is a science fiction novel by English author H. G. Wells about an attempted invasion of Earth by beings from the planet Mars with much greater intelligence and more advanced weapons than humans. The Martians intend to eliminate humankind and conquer Earth because their own older and smaller world has reached the "last stage of exhaustion". It was written between 1895 and 1897, and serialised in Pearson's Magazine in the UK and Cosmopolitan magazine in the US in 1897. The full novel was first published in hardcover in 1898 by William Heinemann.

The War of the Worlds is one of the earliest stories to detail a conflict between humankind and an extraterrestrial race. The novel is the first-person narrative of an unnamed protagonist in Surrey and his younger brother who escapes to Tillingham in Essex as London and Southern England are invaded by Martians. It is one of the most commented-on works in the science fiction canon. Its 1938 radio broadcast directed and narrated by Orson Welles caused a sensation, convincing part of the general public that a Martian invasion was ongoing.

== Plot ==
The plot is similar to other works of invasion literature from the same period and has been variously interpreted as a commentary on the theory of evolution, imperialism, and Victorian era fears, superstitions and prejudices. Wells later noted that inspiration for the plot was the catastrophic effect of European colonisation on the Aboriginal Tasmanians. The story is told in the first-person with a narrator making his way about London as the invasion proceeds. Glimpses of destruction, his retreat, and conversations with other survivors drive the narrative.

Some historians have argued that Wells wrote the book to encourage his readership to question the morality of imperialism. In the preface to his collected works in 1933, Wells explained: "My early, profound and lifelong admiration for [Jonathan] Swift...is particularly evident in a predisposition to make the stories reflect upon contemporary political and social discussions", adding "The War of the Worlds like The Time Machine was another assault on human self-satisfaction", both being "consciously grim, under the influence of Swift's tradition".

Yet across the gulf of space, minds that are to our minds as ours are to those of the beasts that perish, intellects vast and cool and unsympathetic, regarded this earth with envious eyes, and slowly and surely drew their plans against us.

— H. G. Wells (1898), The War of the Worlds

=== The Coming of the Martians ===
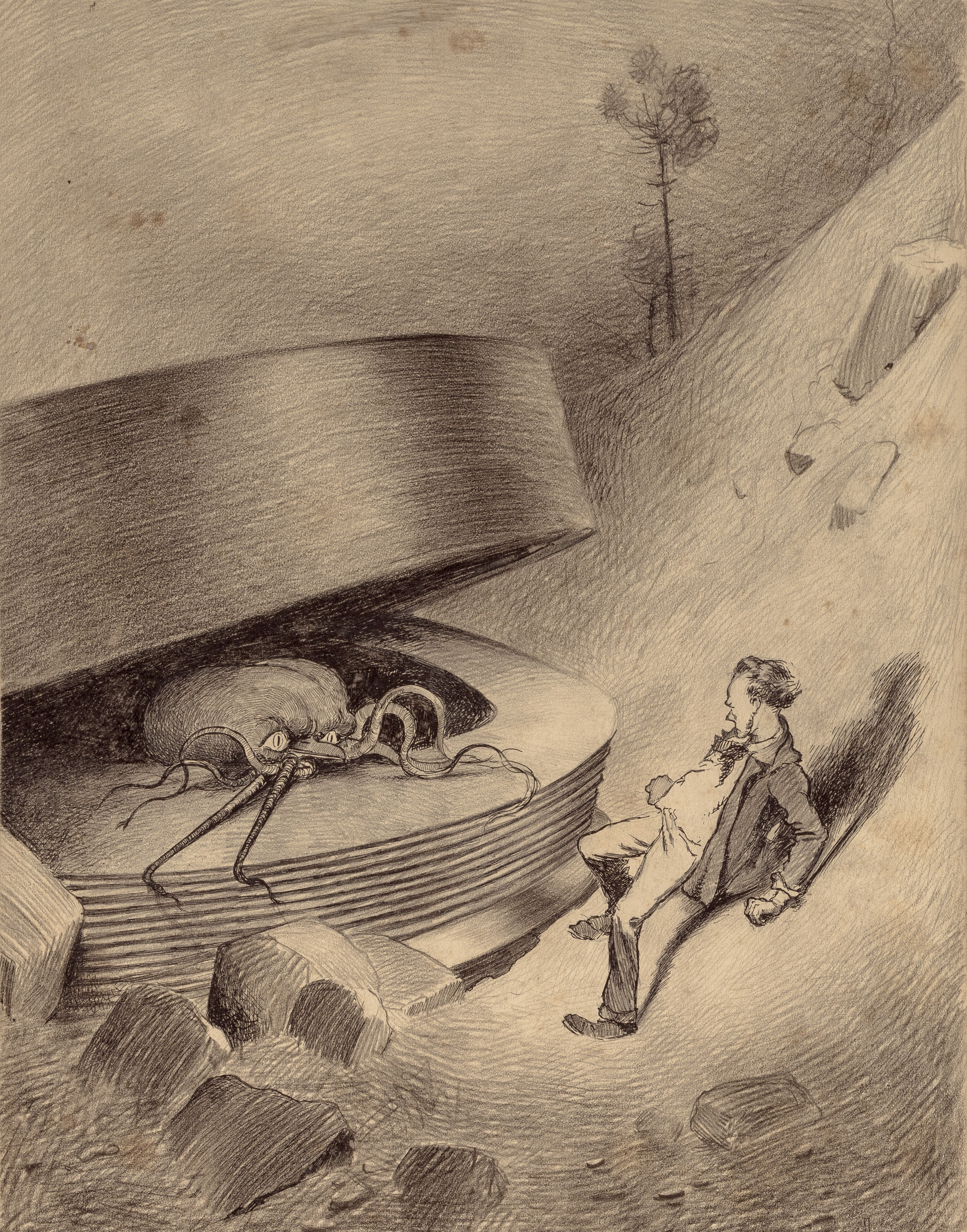
First Martian emerging from the cylinder that had fallen from the sky. Illustration by Henrique Alvim Corrêa for the 1906 edition.

In the mid-1890s, aliens on Mars plot an invasion of Earth because their world is becoming uninhabitable. In the early 20th century, on a Friday in the summer, an object thought to be a meteor lands on Horsell Common, near the narrator's home. It turns out to be an artificial cylinder launched towards Earth months earlier, as Earth and Mars approached opposition. Several Martians emerge and struggle with Earth's gravity and atmosphere. The alien beings do not resemble humans and have an enormously enlarged head and brain, two large eyes, and a beak mouth, on an octopus-like body with long, whip-shaped tentacles for grasping and locomotion. When humans approach the cylinder waving a white flag, the Martians incinerate them using a heat ray. The crowd flees. That evening a large military force surrounds the cylinder.

The next night, the narrator sees a three-legged Martian "fighting-machine" (tripod), armed with a heat-ray and a chemical weapon that dispenses toxic smoke. Tripods have wiped out the human soldiers around the cylinder and destroyed most of Woking. The narrator approaches his own house and finds the landlord dead. He offers shelter to an artilleryman whose battery was wiped out attacking the cylinder. The narrator and the artilleryman try to escape but are separated during a Martian attack. As refugees try to cross the River Wey, the army destroys a tripod with artillery fire, and the Martians retreat. The narrator travels to Walton, where he meets a curate.

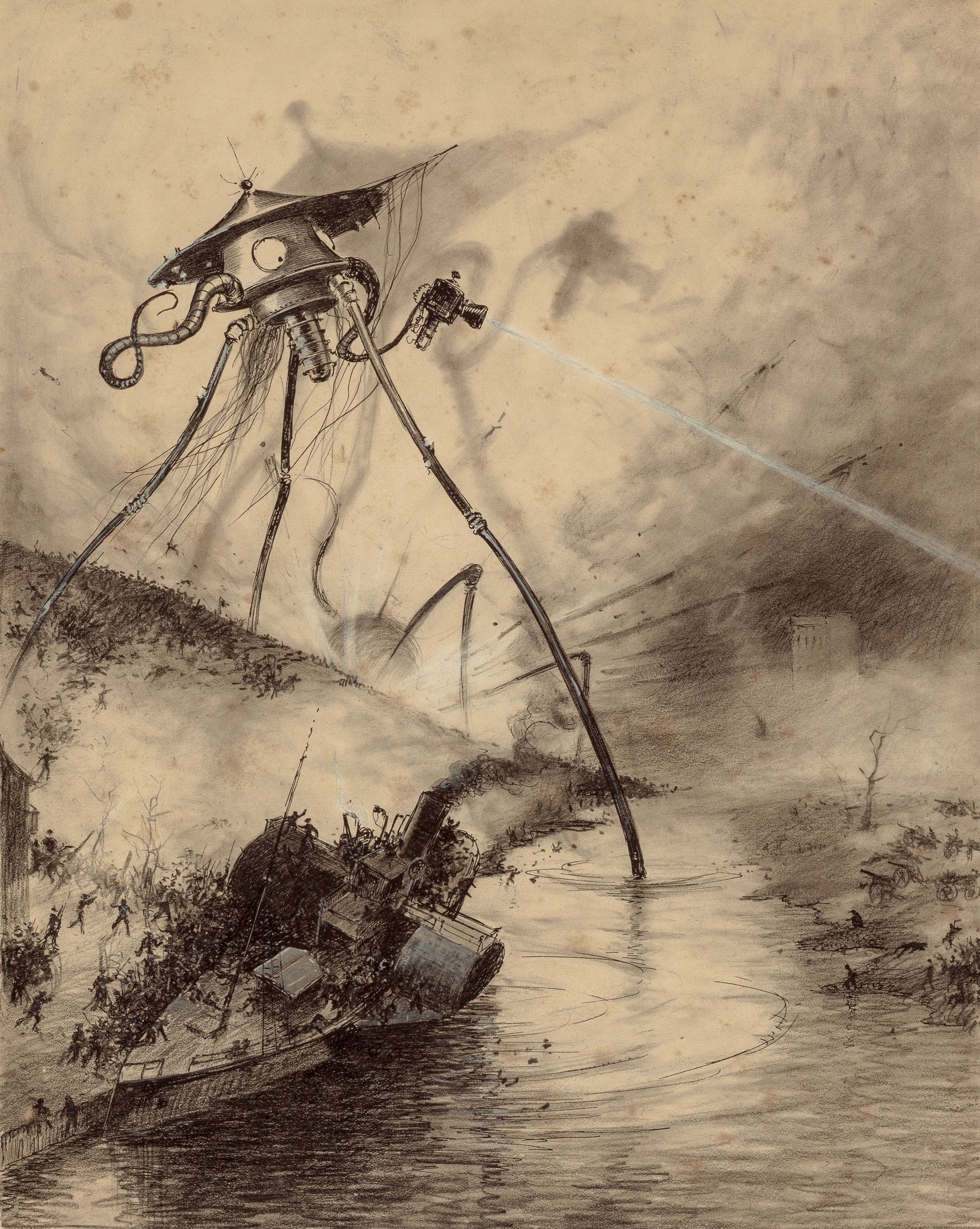
Martians discharging Heat-Rays in the Thames Valley, illustration by Henrique Alvim Corrêa for the 1906 edition.

The Martians attack again, and people begin to flee London, trying to escape the deadly black chemical vapor spread by the invaders. The narrator's brother reaches the coast and buys passage to Europe on a refugee ship. Three Tripods attack, but a torpedo ram, HMS Thunder Child, manages to destroy all three, with the ironclad sinking shortly after the third tripod's destruction due to damage it sustained from the tripods' weapons. Fortunately, its effort was enough to allow the evacuation fleet to escape unscathed. Soon, resistance collapses, and Martians roam the shattered landscape unhindered.

=== The Earth under the Martians ===
In Book Two, the narrator and the curate witness a Martian machine seizing people and tossing them into a metal carrier. The narrator realises that the Martian invaders have plans for their victims. When a fifth Martian cylinder lands, both men are trapped beneath the ruins of a manor house. Hidden in the wreckage, the narrator observes the Martians in the impact pit and learns that they feed on blood, taken now from humans, and that they appear to communicate with some type of telepathy. The curate falls into despair. When he tries to eat their remaining food, the narrator knocks him unconscious. A mechanical tentacle probes the smashed house and removes the curate's body, but the narrator is able to escape and hide.

The Martians abandon the cylinder's crater, and the narrator heads for West London. En route, he finds Martian red weed everywhere, prickly vegetation spreading wherever there is water, but notices that it is slowly dying. On Putney Hill, he encounters the artilleryman, who is planning tactics for how humans can continue fighting the Martians after they control the world. The next day the narrator heads into the deserted ruins of London and hears a strange howling sound coming from immobile Martian fighting machines. On an insane impulse, he resolves to die and end his hopeless situation. He approaches a stationary fighting machine on Primrose Hill, expecting to be killed. To his joy and relief, he discovers that all the Martians are dead, killed by earthly bacteria, to which they had no immunity. The martian invasion lasts around three weeks.

The narrator suffers a nervous breakdown, over the course of three days. Returning to Woking, he finds his wife. In the following days, humankind gradually recovers and makes scientific progress from studying the Martian corpses and machines. However, there is still the humbling realization of Earth's vulnerability and the possibility of another invasion.

== Background ==
=== Inspiration ===
Wells explained that he was exposed to the scenario of an empty and depopulated London almost simultaneously by a friend during a conversation and through the novel A Sensational Trance, by Forbes Dawson. Being attracted to the idea about writing a similar story himself, he tried to come up with a reason for why London was empty, and concluded the one that made the most sense was a mass exodus. When thinking about what could have caused the flight, he suddenly remembered his brother's idea about superior beings from another planet suddenly dropping from the sky. Wells's son Anthony West claimed another seed for the novel can be found in The Time Machine, where the narrator speculates about the possible future evolution of humanity, thinking it could have "developed into something inhuman, unsympathetic, and overwhelmingly powerful". Next, the picture came to him that the aliens would arrive in interplanetary cylinders, an idea he borrowed from Jules Verne's stories about spaceflight. When deciding from what planet, he picked Mars, both because it was the one most similar to Earth, and because scientists of the time wrongly assumed Mars was older than Earth, and therefore the Martians would have a longer evolutionary history than humans, having evolved into much more advanced creatures. It’s possible that Wells was specifically inspired by the ending of the 1889 story Mr. Stranger’s Sealed Packet by Hugh MacColl, which ends with the main character marrying a Martian woman, who dies to bacteria that she has no immunity for.

Wells was trained as a science teacher during the latter half of the 1880s. One of his teachers was Thomas Henry Huxley, a major advocate of Darwinism. Wells later taught science, and his first book was a biology textbook. Much of his work makes contemporary ideas of science and technology easily understandable.

=== Scientific setting ===
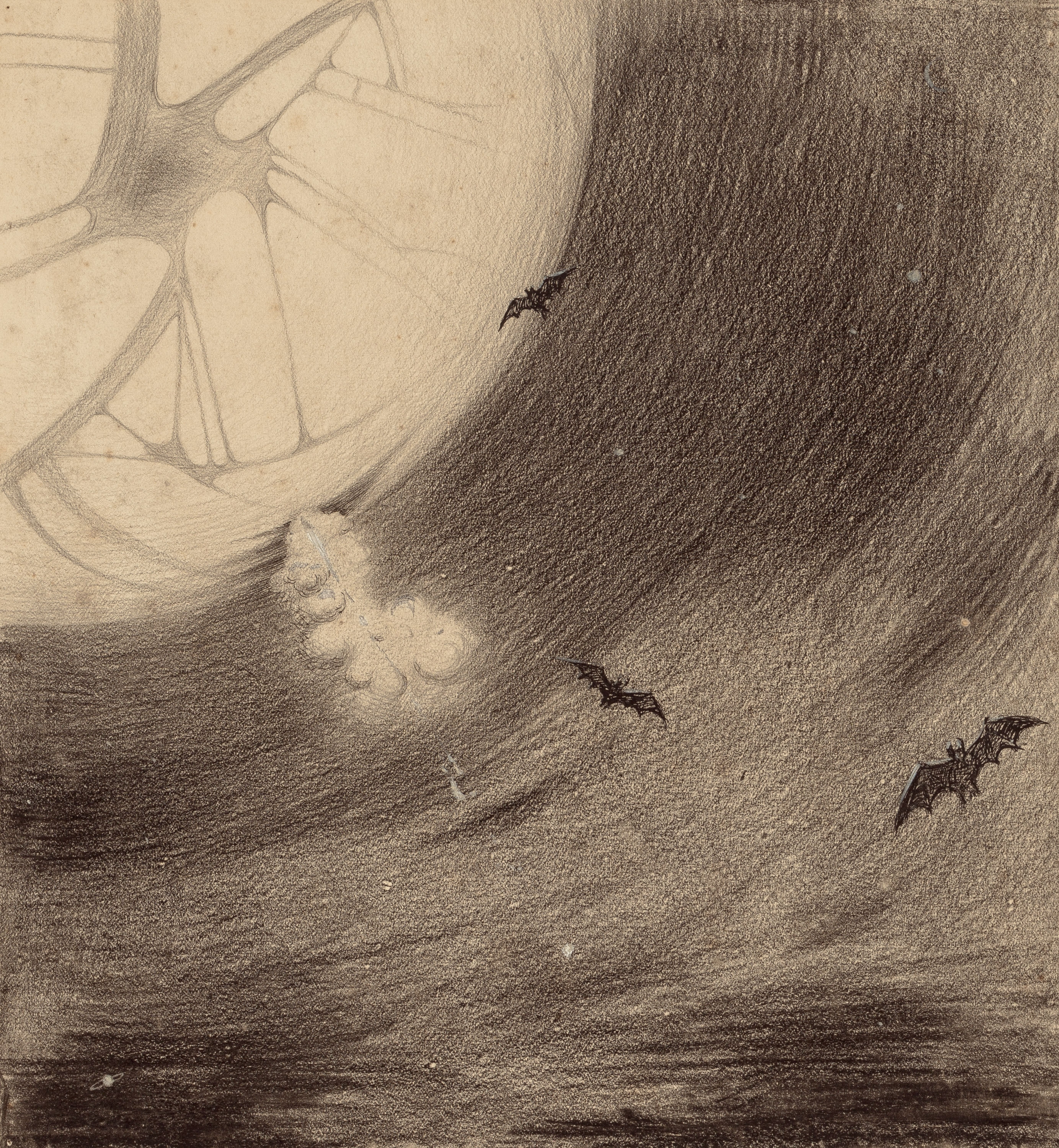
The Martians launch a cylinder to start their attack on Earth, illustration by Henrique Alvim Corrêa for the 1906 edition, showing "canals" on Mars.

The War of the Worlds presents itself as a factual account of the Martian invasion. The scientific fascinations of the novel are established in the opening chapter. The narrator views Mars through a telescope, and Wells offers the image of the superior Martians having observed human affairs as though watching tiny organisms through a microscope. In August 1894, a French astronomer reported sightings of a "strange light" on Mars. Wells used this observation to open the novel, imagining these lights to be the launching of the Martian cylinders toward Earth.

Italian astronomer Giovanni Schiaparelli described apparent linear features on Mars in 1877, wrongly supposing these were canali (Italian for "channels" or "canals"). In 1895, American astronomer Percival Lowell speculated in his book Mars that these might be irrigation channels, constructed by a sentient life form to support existence on an arid, dying world. The novel also explores ideas related to Charles Darwin's theory of natural selection.

In 1896, Wells published an essay on 'Intelligence on Mars' in the Saturday Review, setting out ideas about life on Mars. Wells speculates on the nature of Martian inhabitants and how their evolutionary progress might compare to humans. These ideas are used almost unchanged in The War of the Worlds.

=== Physical location ===
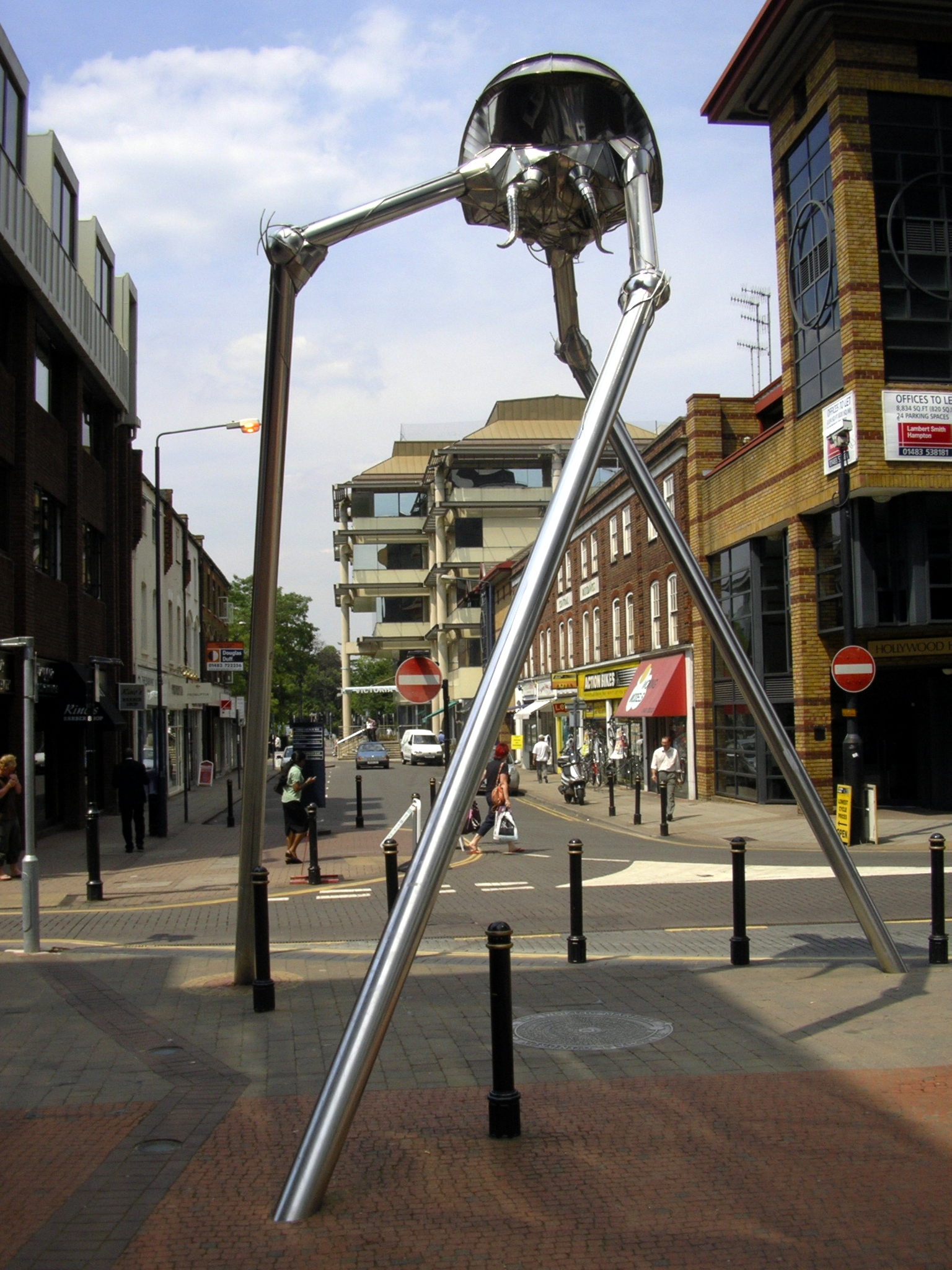
An art installation in Woking depicts a tripod and (out of picture) a Martian cylinder. "The Woking Martian"; Michael Condron, 1998

In 1895, Wells married Catherine Robbins, and moved with her to Woking in Surrey. There, he spent his mornings walking or cycling in the countryside, and his afternoons writing. He used these bicycle tours to find places he would refer to in his novel. He wrote in his autobiography that he “wheeled about the district marking down suitable places and people for destruction by my Martians”. A 23 feet (7.0 m) high sculpture of a tripod fighting machine, entitled The Woking Martian, based on descriptions in the novel, stands in Crown Passage close to the local railway station in Woking, designed and constructed in 1998 by artist Michael Condron. Fifty meters further up the pedestrianised street is a concrete and brick representation of a Martian cylinder.

=== Cultural setting ===
Wells's depiction of late Victorian suburban culture in the novel was an accurate representation of his experiences. In the late 19th century, the British Empire was the predominant colonial power on the globe, making its domestic heart a poignant and terrifying starting point for an invasion by Martians with their own imperialist agenda.

== Publication ==
In the late 1890s it was common for novels to be serialised in magazines or newspapers before publication in full, with each part of the serialisation ending on a cliffhanger to entice audiences to buy the next issue. This practice was familiar from Charles Dickens's novels earlier in the 19th century. The War of the Worlds was first serialised in the United Kingdom in Pearson's Magazine from April to December 1897. Wells was paid £200 and Pearsons demanded to know the ending of the piece before committing to publish it. The complete volume was first published by Heinemann in 1898 and has been in print ever since, although several editions exist. The 1924 Atlantic edition is considered the definitive text used for reprints. In addition, a revised version for schools was first published by Heinemann in 1951.

As of 2023, the novel has sold over one million copies worldwide.

Two unauthorised serialisations of the novel were published in the United States prior to publication of the novel. The first was in the New York Evening Journal where the story was published as Fighters from Mars or the War of the Worlds, located in a New York setting, between December 1897 and January 1898. The second version had the Martians landing near and around Boston, and was published by The Boston Post as Fighters from Mars, or the War of the Worlds in and near Boston in 1898. Hughes and Geduld suggest that Wells may inadvertently have agreed to the serialisation in the New York Evening Journal.

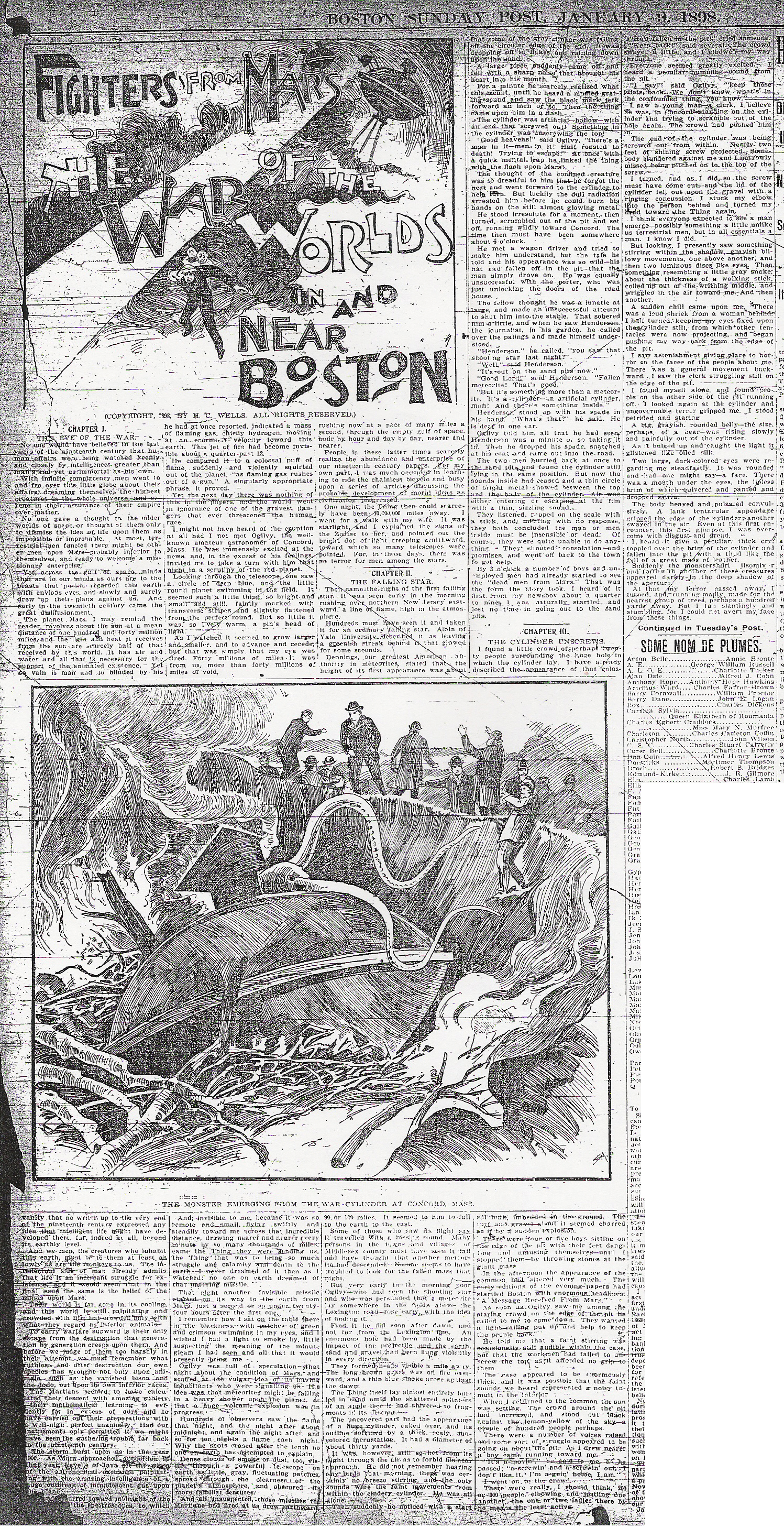
Fighters from Mars or the War of the Worlds in and near Boston, unauthorized adaptation of the novel in the Boston Post in 1898

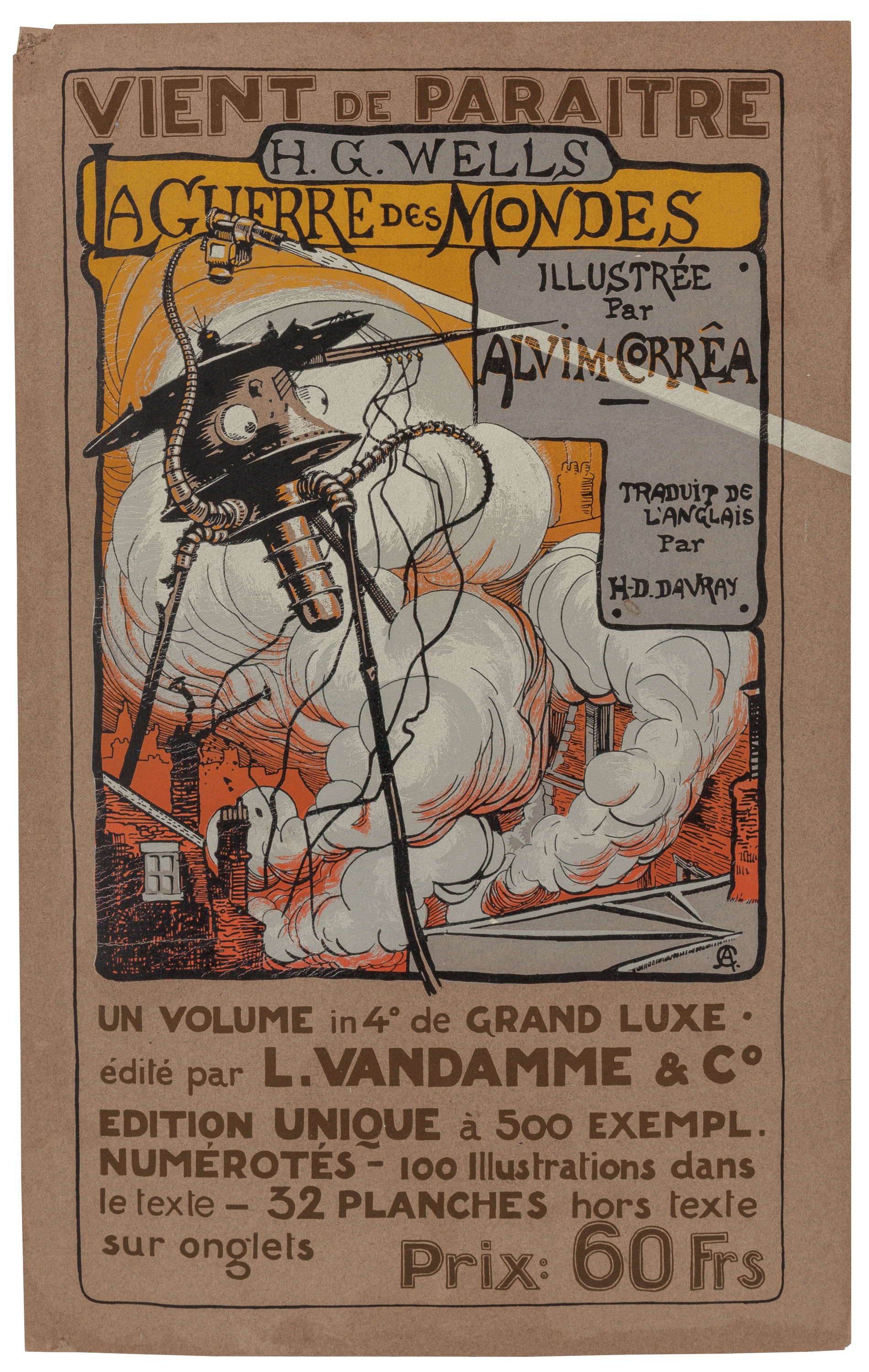
Advertisement for deluxe edition of The War of the Worlds (La Guerre des Mondes) in French, published in Belgium in 1906 with illustrations by Henrique Alvim Corrêa

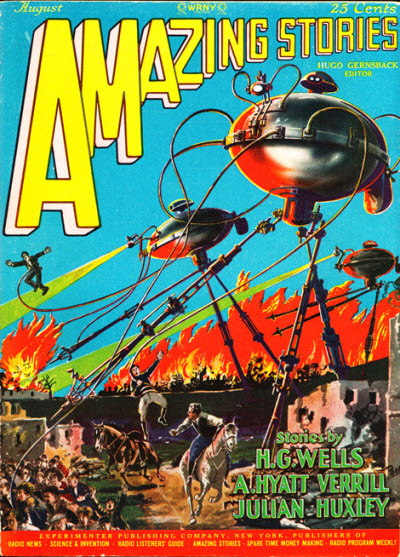
Cover of Amazing Stories August 1927 issue, for a reprint of The War of the Worlds, artwork by Frank R. Paul

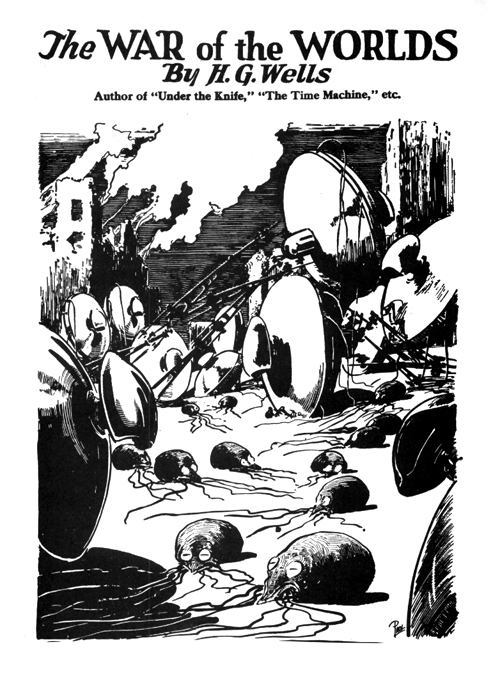
Title page, 1927 Amazing Stories reprint, illustration by Frank R. Paul

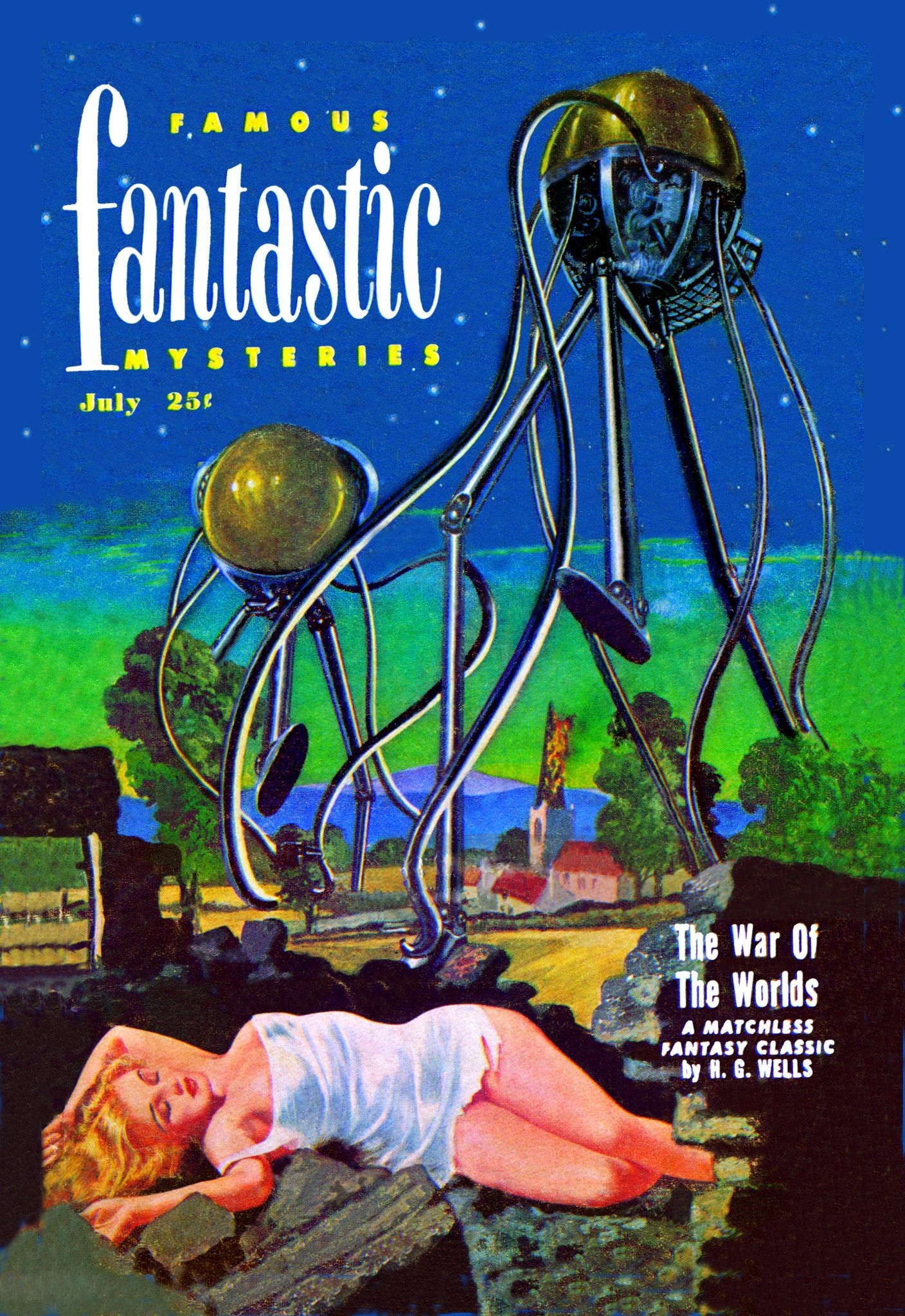
A reprint of The War of the Worlds was cover-featured on the July 1951 issue of Famous Fantastic Mysteries.

== Reception ==
=== Contemporary ===
The War of the Worlds was received favourably by both readers and critics. The Illustrated London News wrote that the serialisation in Pearson's magazine had "a very distinct success". The story did even better as a book, and reviewers rated it as "the very best work he has yet produced", and highlighting the story's originality in showing Mars in a new light through the concept of an alien invasion of Earth. Writing for Harper's Weekly, Sidney Brooks admired Wells's writing style: "he has complete check over his imagination, and makes it effective by turning his most horrible of fancies into the language of the simplest, least startling denomination". Praising Wells's "power of vivid realization", The Daily News reviewer wrote, "the imagination, the extraordinary power of presentation, the moral significance of the book cannot be contested". There was, however, some criticism of the brutal nature of the events in the narrative.

== Interpretations ==
=== Natural selection ===
In the novel, the conflict between humankind and the Martians is portrayed as a survival of the fittest, with the Martians whose longer period of successful evolution on the older Mars has led to their developing a superior intelligence, able to create weapons far in advance of humans on the younger planet Earth, who have not had the opportunity to develop sufficient intelligence to construct similar weapons.

In the Epilogue to the novel, Wells explicitly mentions "natural selection" in the death of the Martians: "But by virtue of this natural selection of our kind we have developed resisting-power; to no germs do we succumb without a struggle, and to many—those that cause putrefaction in dead matter, for instance—our living frames are altogether immune". By contrast, "there are no bacteria in Mars" and the invading Martians were "slain by the putrefactive and disease bacteria against which their systems were unprepared".

=== Human evolution ===
The narrator refers to an 1893 publication suggesting that the evolution of the human brain might outstrip the development of the body. Organs such as the stomach, nose, teeth, and hair would wither. Humans would be left as thinking machines, needing mechanical devices much like the Tripod fighting machines, to be able to interact with their environment. This publication is probably Wells's own "The Man of the Year Million", first published in The Pall Mall Gazette on 6 November 1893, which suggests similar ideas. In his vision for the future of humanity, Wells imagined them as having huge hands and large heads with soulful eyes. The rest of the body had shriveled into nothing. Instead of a digestive system, they absorb liquid nutrients from a pool through the surface of their body, while machinery does all the work their muscles can no longer accomplish, and their emotions have been replaced by an intellect that have turned society into a "paragon of order and calm" through co-operation.

=== Colonialism and imperialism ===
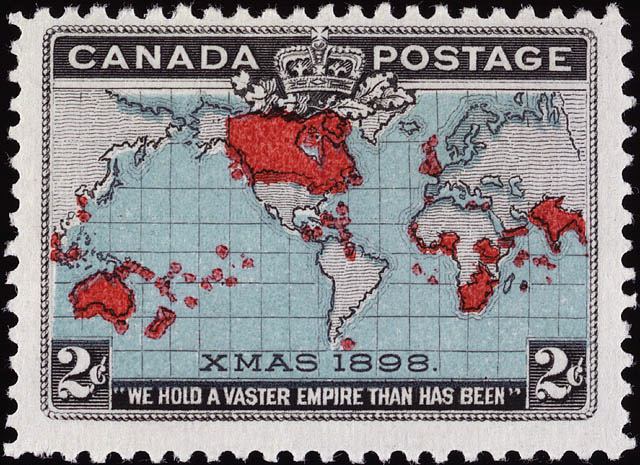
A Canadian postage stamp showing the British Empire at the time of the novel's publication

While invasion literature had provided an imaginative foundation for the idea of the heart of the British Empire being conquered by foreign forces, it was not until The War of the Worlds that the British public was presented with an adversary that was completely superior to themselves. A significant motivating force behind the success of the British Empire was its use of sophisticated technology; the Martians, also attempting to establish an empire on Earth, have technology superior to their British adversaries. In The War of the Worlds, Wells depicted an imperial power as the victim of imperial aggression, and thus perhaps encouraging the reader to consider the morality of imperialism itself.

=== Social Darwinism ===
Social Darwinism was a theory in Wells's time that argued that the success of different ethnic groups in world affairs, and social classes in a society, were the result of evolutionary struggle in which the group or class more fit to succeed did so. The novel dramatises these ideas, as the more advanced Martians exercise their "rights" as a superior race over humans.

== Antecedents ==
=== Terrestrial ===
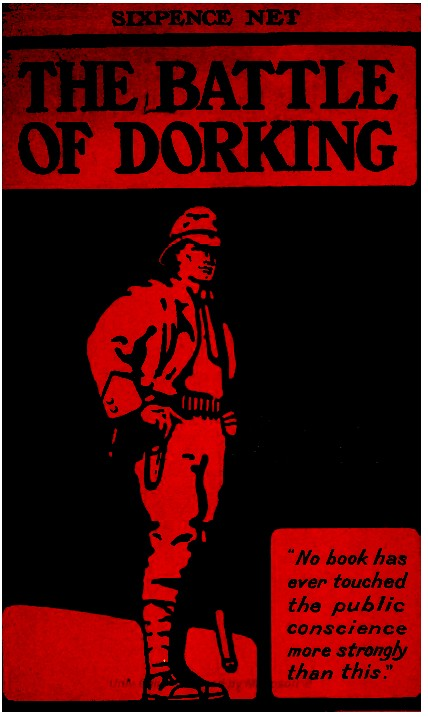
The Battle of Dorking initiated invasion literature.

Between 1871 and 1914 more than 60 works of fiction for adult readers describing invasions of Great Britain were published. The original work was The Battle of Dorking (1871) by George Tomkyns Chesney, which portrays a surprise German attack and landing on the south coast of England, made possible by the distraction of the Royal Navy in colonial patrols and the army in an Irish insurrection. The German army makes short work of English militia and rapidly marches to London. This story was published in Blackwood's Magazine in May 1871 and was so popular that it was reprinted a month later as a pamphlet which sold 80,000 copies. There are clear plot similarities between Wells's book and The Battle of Dorking, with the destruction of the Home Counties of Southern England by the invader. However, The War of the Worlds is a far more imaginative story. The invasion literature genre provided a familiar base from which to support the success of The War of the Worlds. It may also have proved an important foundation for Wells's ideas, as he had never seen or fought in a war.

=== Extraterrestrial ===
Wells is credited with establishing several extraterrestrial themes which were later greatly expanded by science fiction writers in the 20th century, including first contact and war between planets and their differing species. There were, however, stories of aliens and alien invasion prior to the publication of The War of the Worlds.

Voltaire's Micromégas (1752) includes two beings from Saturn and Sirius who, though human in appearance, are of immense size and visit the Earth out of curiosity. At first the difference in scale between them and the peoples of Earth makes them think that the planet is uninhabited. When they discover the haughty Earth-centric views of Earth philosophers, they are greatly amused by how important Earth beings think they are compared to greater beings in the universe such as themselves.

In 1892 Robert Potter, an Australian clergyman, published The Germ Growers in London. It describes a covert invasion by aliens who take on the appearance of human beings and attempt to develop a virulent disease to assist in their plans for global conquest. It was not widely read, and consequently Wells's vastly more successful novel is generally credited as the seminal alien invasion story.

The first science fiction to be set primarily on Mars may be Across the Zodiac: The Story of a Wrecked Record (1880) by Percy Greg. It concerned a civil war on Mars. Another Mars novel, this time dealing with benevolent Martians coming to Earth to give humankind the benefit of their advanced knowledge, was published in 1897 by Kurd Lasswitz – Two Planets (Auf Zwei Planeten). It was not translated until 1971, and thus may not have influenced Wells, although it did depict a Mars influenced by the ideas of Percival Lowell.

Other examples are Hugh MacColl's Mr. Stranger's Sealed Packet (1889), which took place on Mars, Gustavus W. Pope's Journey to Mars (1894), and Pharaoh's Broker by Elmer Dwiggins, writing under the name of Ellsworth Douglass, in which the protagonist encounters an Egyptian civilisation on Mars which, while parallel to that of Earth, has evolved somehow independently.

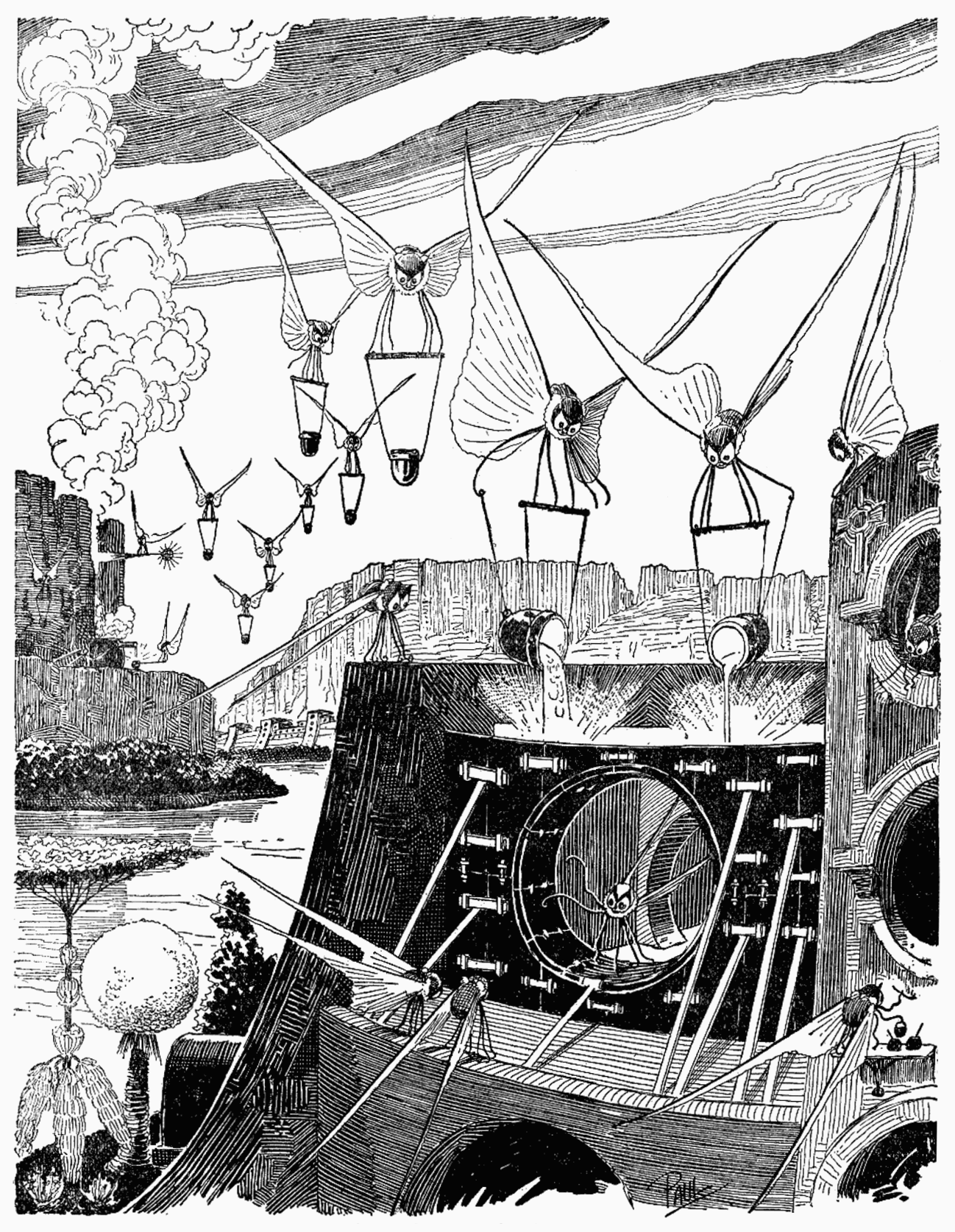
Illustration for “The Crystal Egg” by Frank R. Paul, 1926

"The Crystal Egg", a short story by Wells that featured alien creatures on Mars, appeared in the May 1897 issue of the literary magazine The New Review. The narrative concerns a curious egg-shaped object in which a viewer could discern scenes on another world that had two moons in the sky, presumably indicating Mars. Strange winged beings could be seen pursuing activities in city-like structures, viewed from another crystal egg on a mast. The story appeared at the same time that The War of the Worlds was being serialized in Pearson's Magazine and has been interpreted as a kind of precursor to the full novel, suggesting that beings on Mars had been using such two-way crystals to observe Earth and its inhabitants. However, the Martians described in "The Crystal Egg" bear no resemblance to the octopus-like invaders of Earth in The War of the Worlds.

== Influence ==
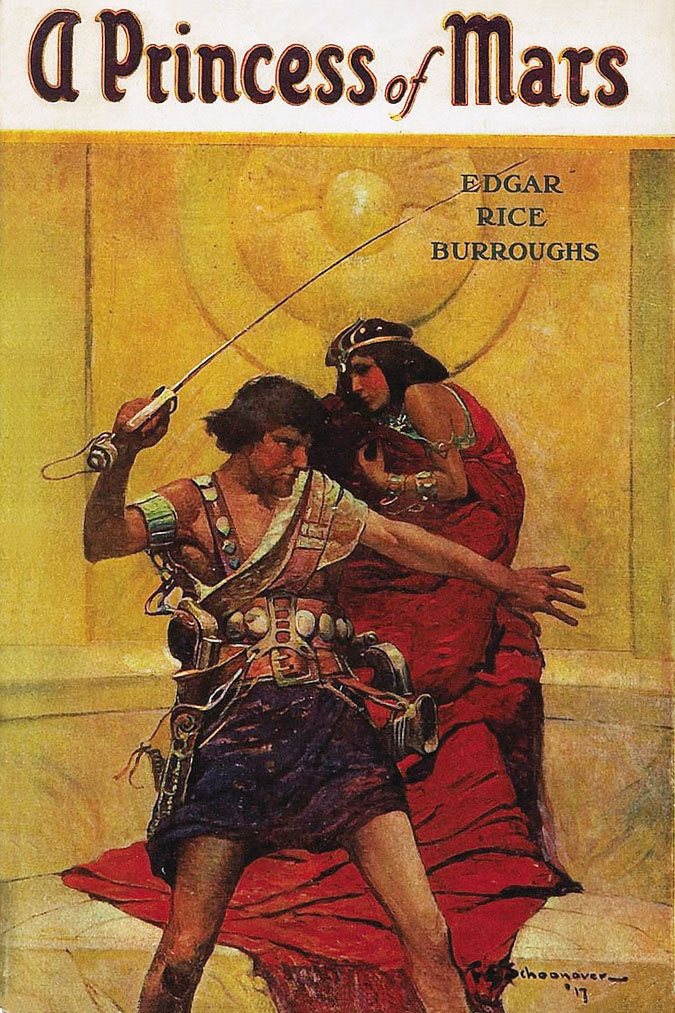
Edgar Rice Burroughs's A Princess of Mars (cover illustrated by Frank Schoonover)

A popular misconception is that The War of the Worlds is the first alien invasion story and that H.G. Wells is the father of the alien invasion genre. In 1892, the novel The Germ Growers by Robert Potter was published, invalidating any claims for The War of the Worlds to be the first alien invasion story. Additionally, Wells was not the first author to show an alien invasion on a large scale. The 1897 novel Two Planets by Kurd Lasswitz shows a worldwide alien invasion, unlike Wells's novel, which showed a countrywide invasion.

Despite all of this, The War of the Worlds has vastly overshadowed its two predecessors in both influence and popularity, making the alien invasion genre a household name in science fiction. Besides popularizing the genre, the novel also popularized the term "Martians" for hostile aliens of all kinds.

Six weeks after the publication of the novel, The Boston Post newspaper published another alien invasion story, an unauthorised sequel to The War of the Worlds, which turned the tables on the invaders. Edison's Conquest of Mars was written by Garrett P. Serviss, a now little-remembered writer, who described the inventor Thomas Edison leading a counterattack against the invaders on their home soil. Though this is actually a sequel to Fighters from Mars, a revised and unauthorised reprint of The War of the Worlds, they both were first printed in the Boston Post in 1898. Lazar Lagin published Major Well Andyou in the U.S.S.R. in 1962, an alternative view of events in The War of the Worlds from the viewpoint of a traitor.

== Adaptations ==
As of 2025, The War of the Worlds has inspired eight films, as well as various radio dramas, comics, video games, television series, and sequels or parallel stories by other authors. Most are set in different locations or eras to the original novel. Among the adaptations is the 1938 radio broadcast narrated and directed by Orson Welles, set in contemporary North America and presented as a live news story happening in New Jersey.

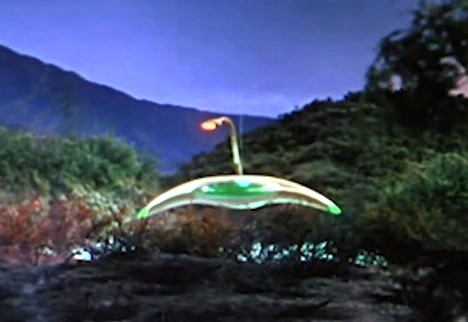
1953 George Pal film adaptation with Martian tripod fighting machines reimagined as manta-ray-like craft that move on three invisible magnetic legs, armed with a cobra-like mounted heat ray and wingtips that fire skeleton beams

The first film adaptation was The War of the Worlds, produced in 1953 by George Pal, directed by Byron Haskin, and starring Gene Barry and Ann Robinson, set in contemporary Southern California and notable for its Academy-Award-winning special effects. In 2005, Steven Spielberg directed another film version starring Tom Cruise, set in contemporary North America on the East Coast. Another film adaptation, directed by Rich Lee and starring rapper Ice Cube, was released in 2025; it has attracted negative reviews and is considered one of worst films ever made.

In 1978, Jeff Wayne produced a musical album of the story, with the voices of Richard Burton and David Essex. Wayne has also toured two live concert musical versions. That same year a stage adaptation by Albert Reyes was mounted at the Nat Horne Theatre in New York.

An immersive experience of The War of the Worlds set to Jeff Wayne's score opened in London in 2019. The show used a blend of virtual reality, volumetric holograms and live theatre.

== Gallery of early illustrations ==
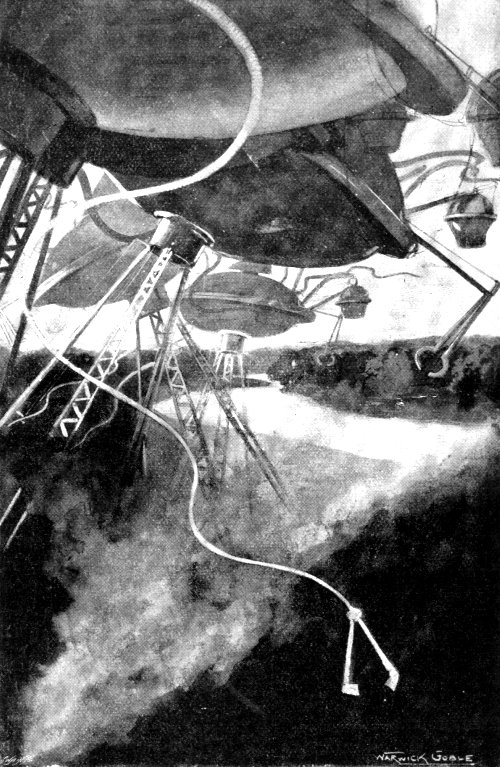
The Martian fighting machines attack (Warwick Goble 1897)

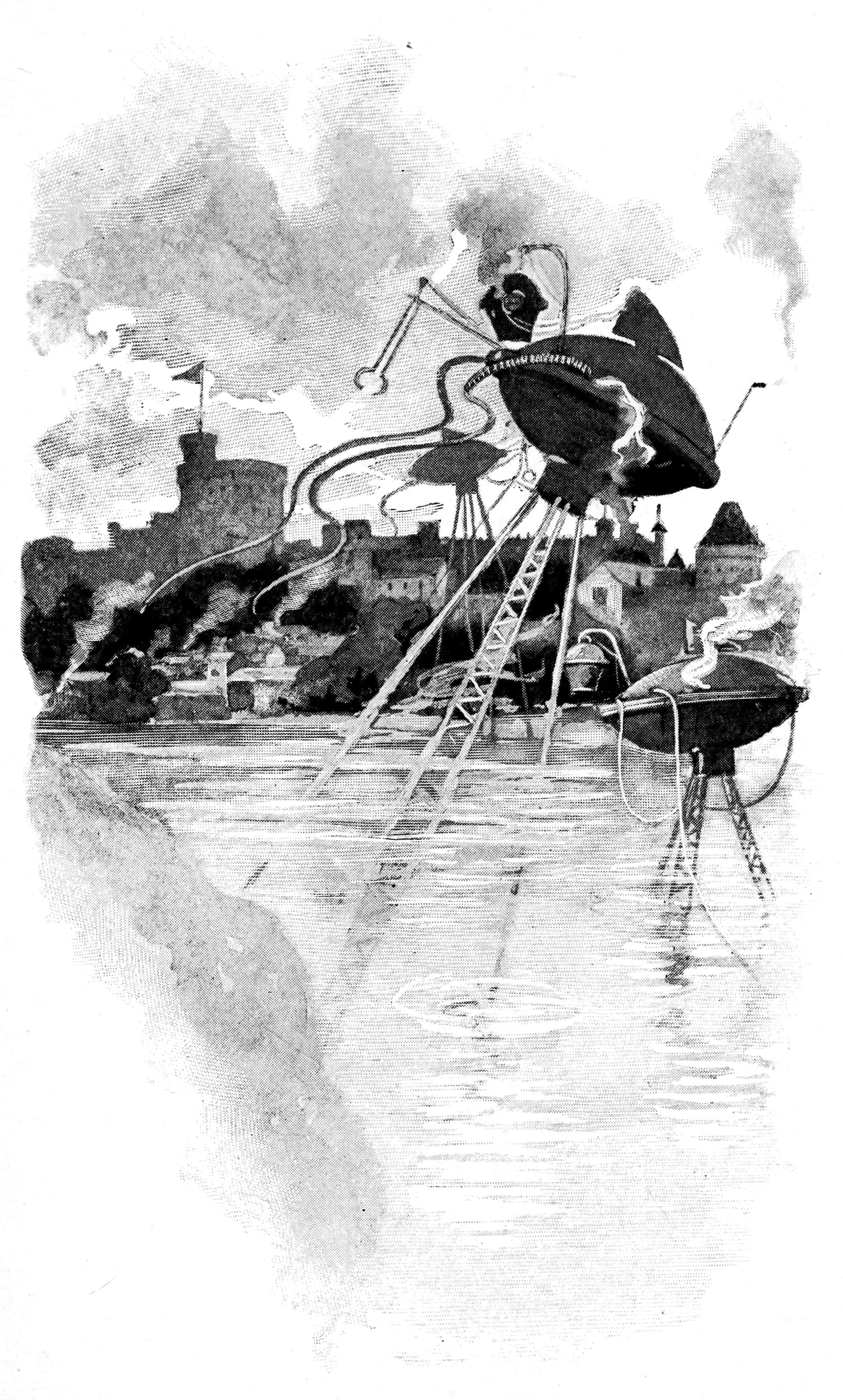
The machines move (Warwick Goble 1897)

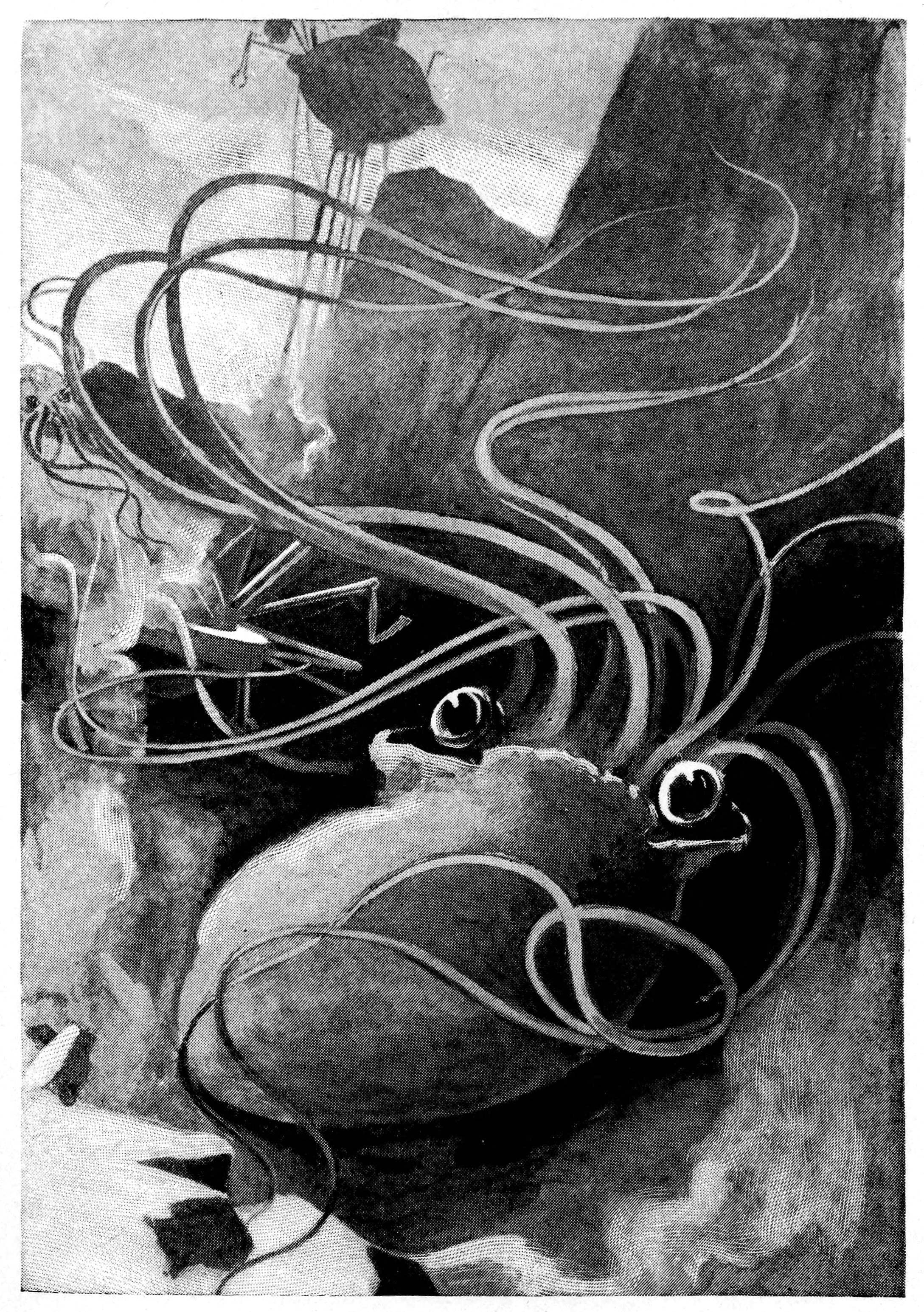
The Martian itself (Warwick Goble 1897)

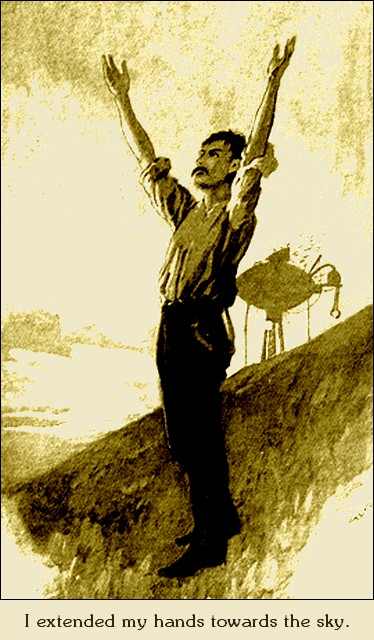
Narrator discovers the Martians are dead and expresses relief and gratitude (Warwick Goble 1897)

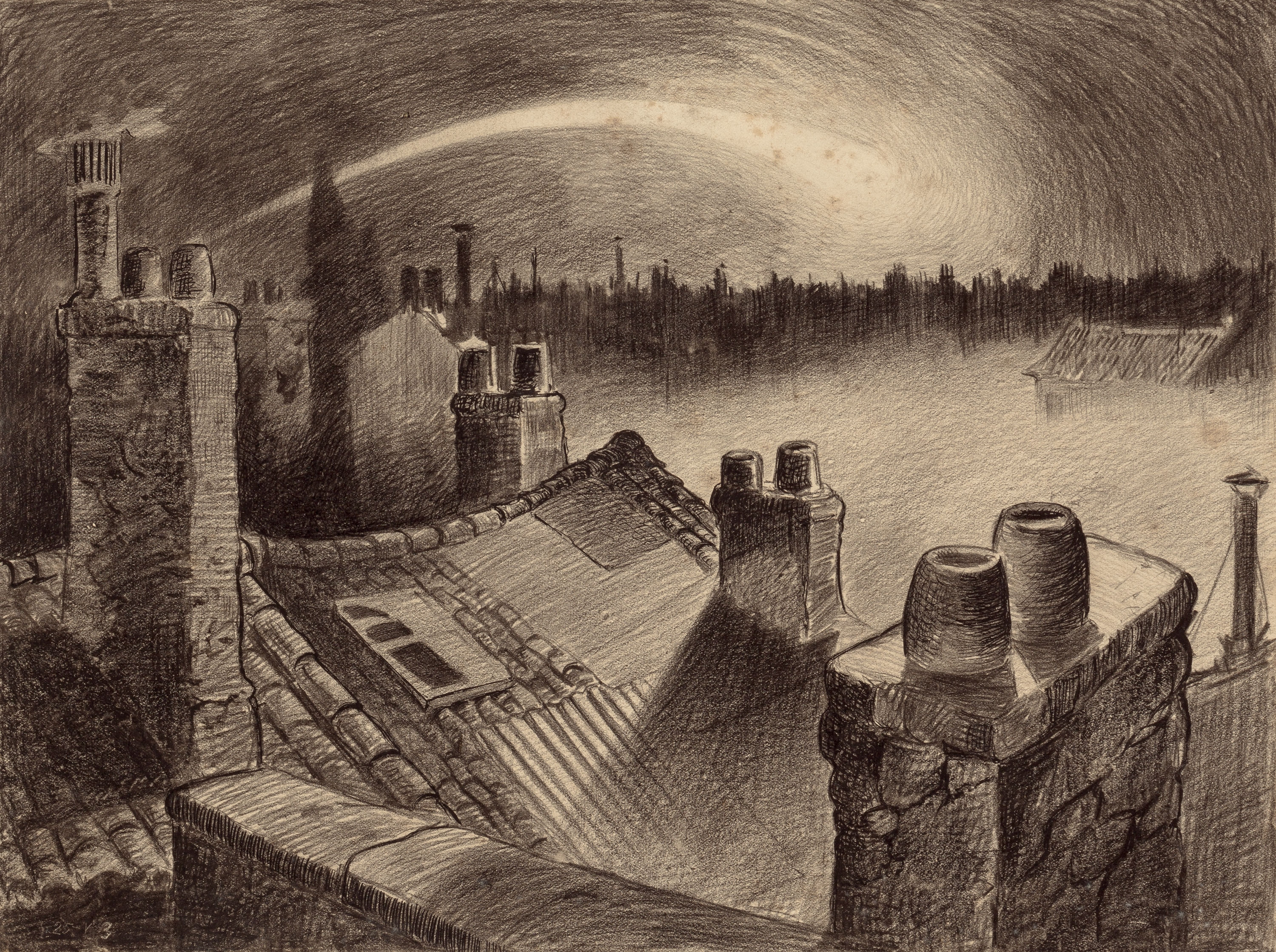
Martian cylinder appears as a falling star (Henrique Alvim Corrêa 1906)

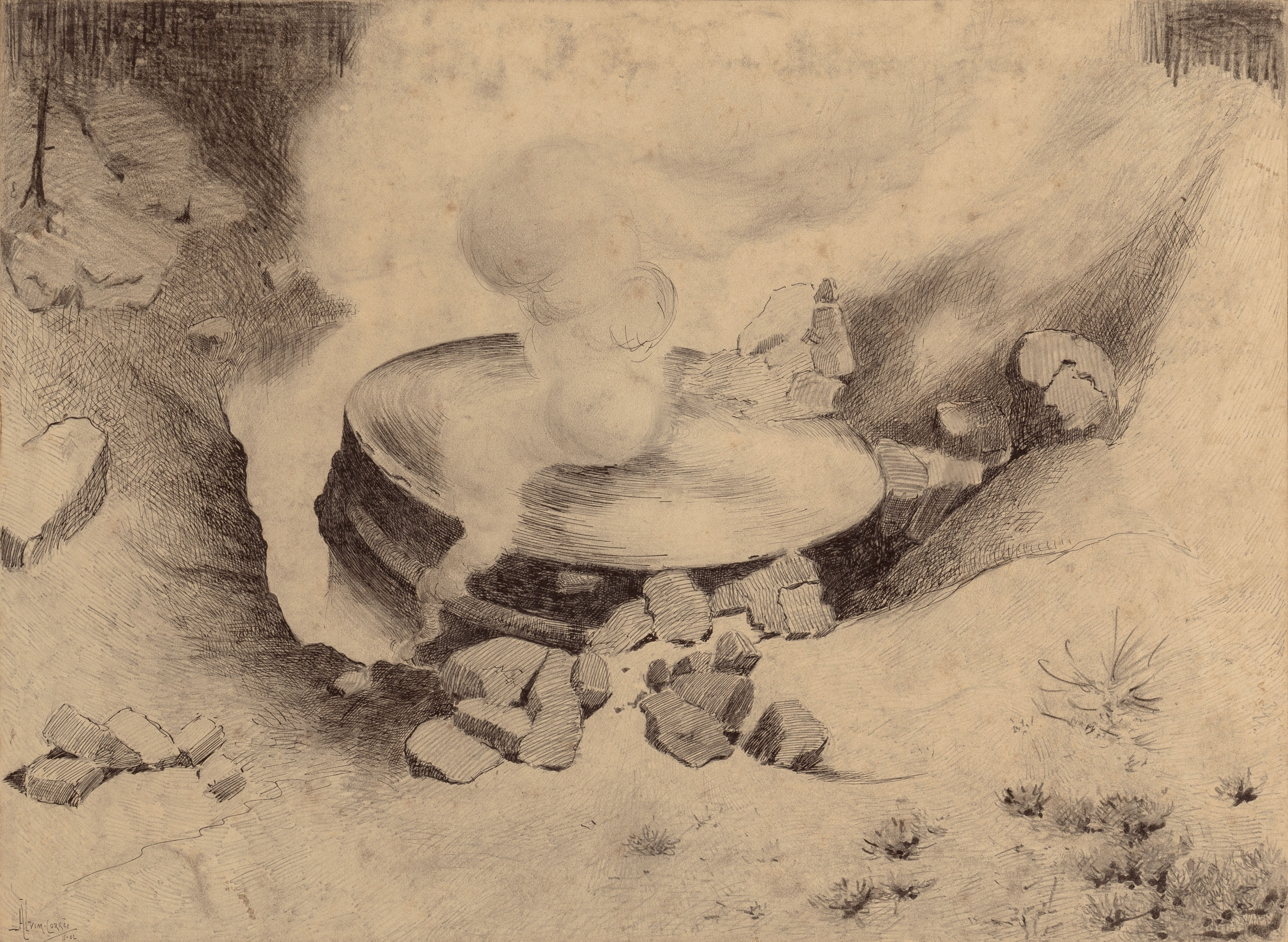
The mysterious "thing" that has landed in the sand-pits (Henrique Alvim Corrêa 1906)

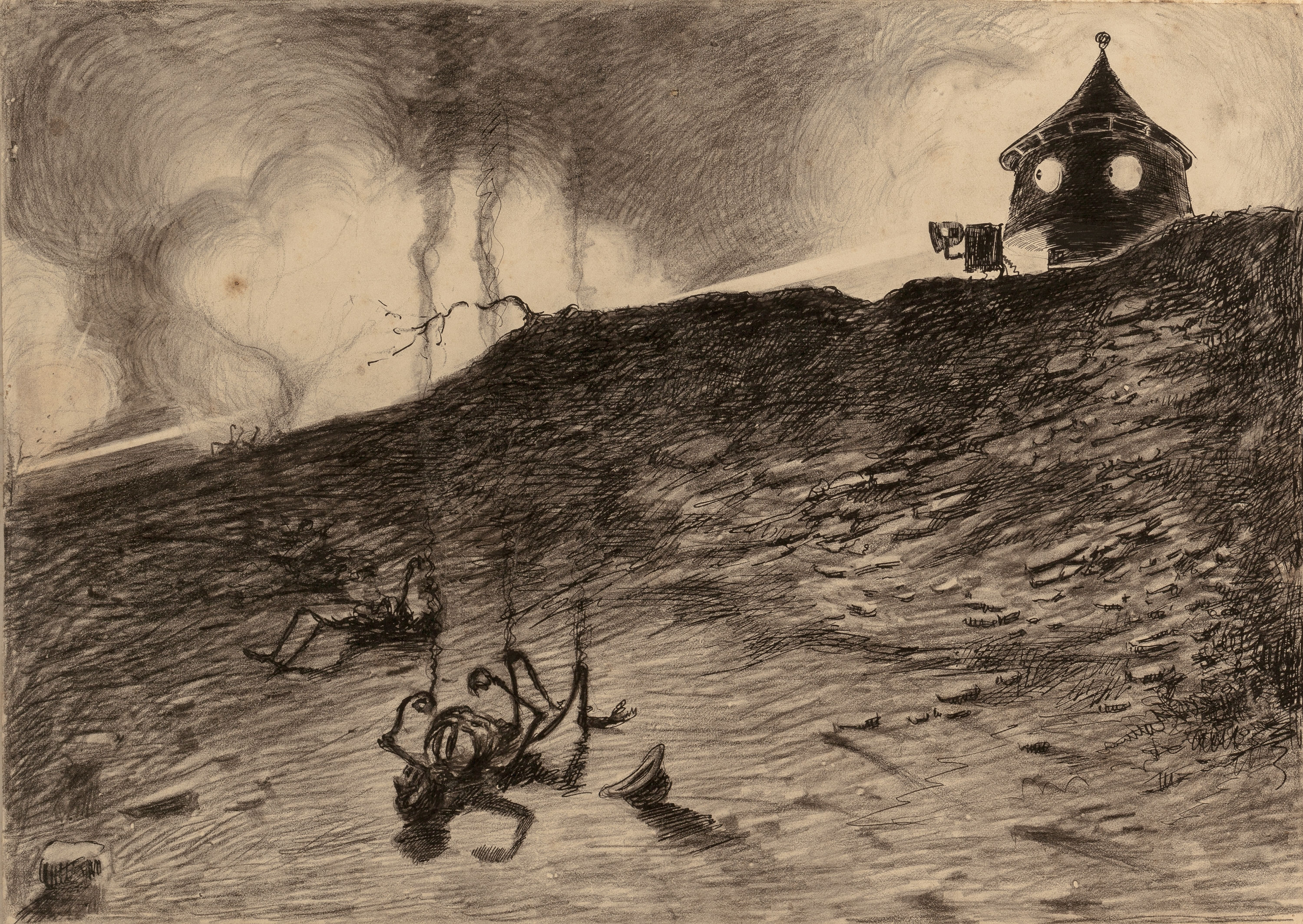
The Martian heat ray incinerates the humans who approached the pit where the cylinder landed (Henrique Alvim Corrêa 1906)

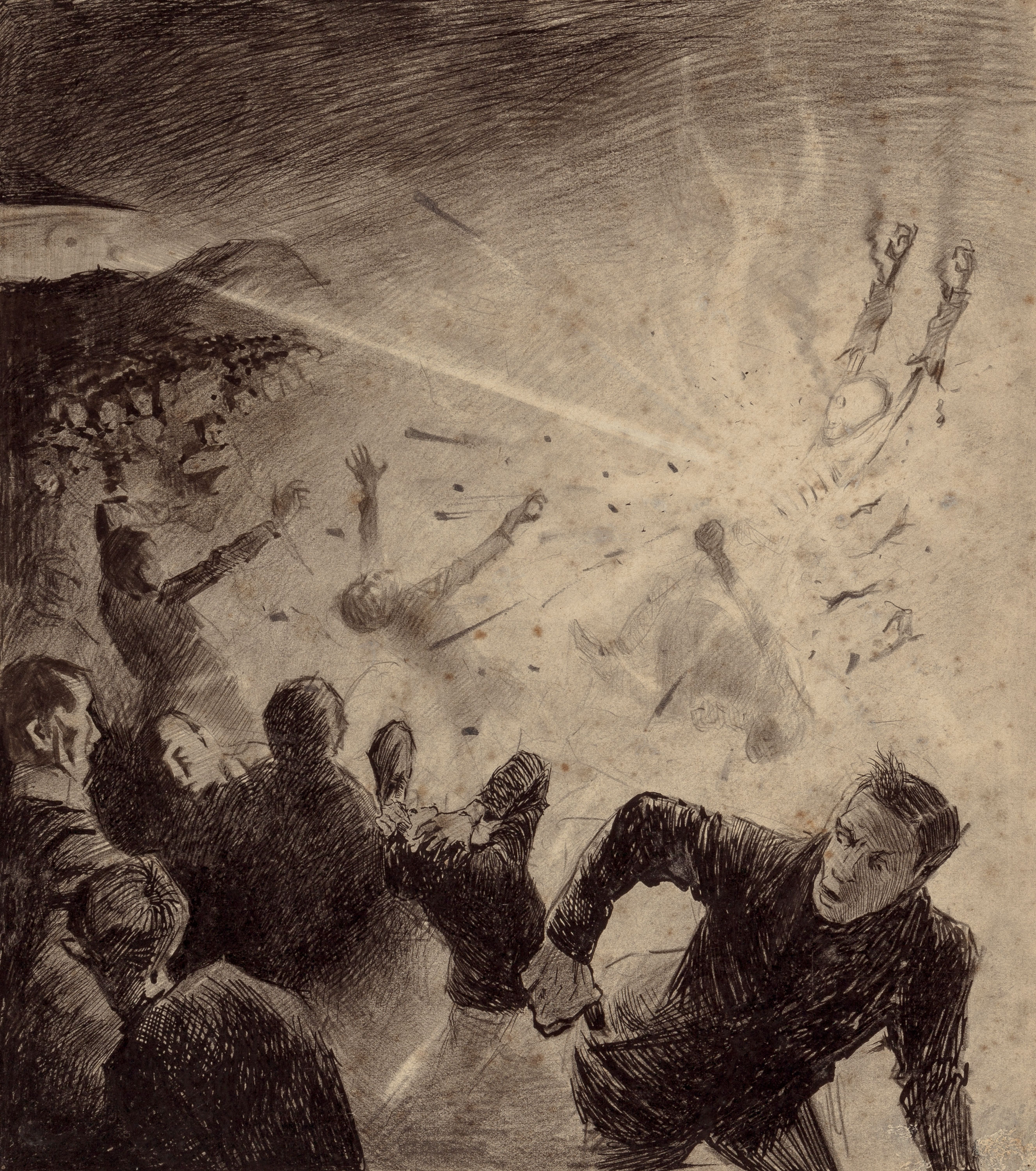
The Martians turn the heat ray on the crowds gathered near the pit, bringing "flaming death" (Henrique Alvim Corrêa 1906)

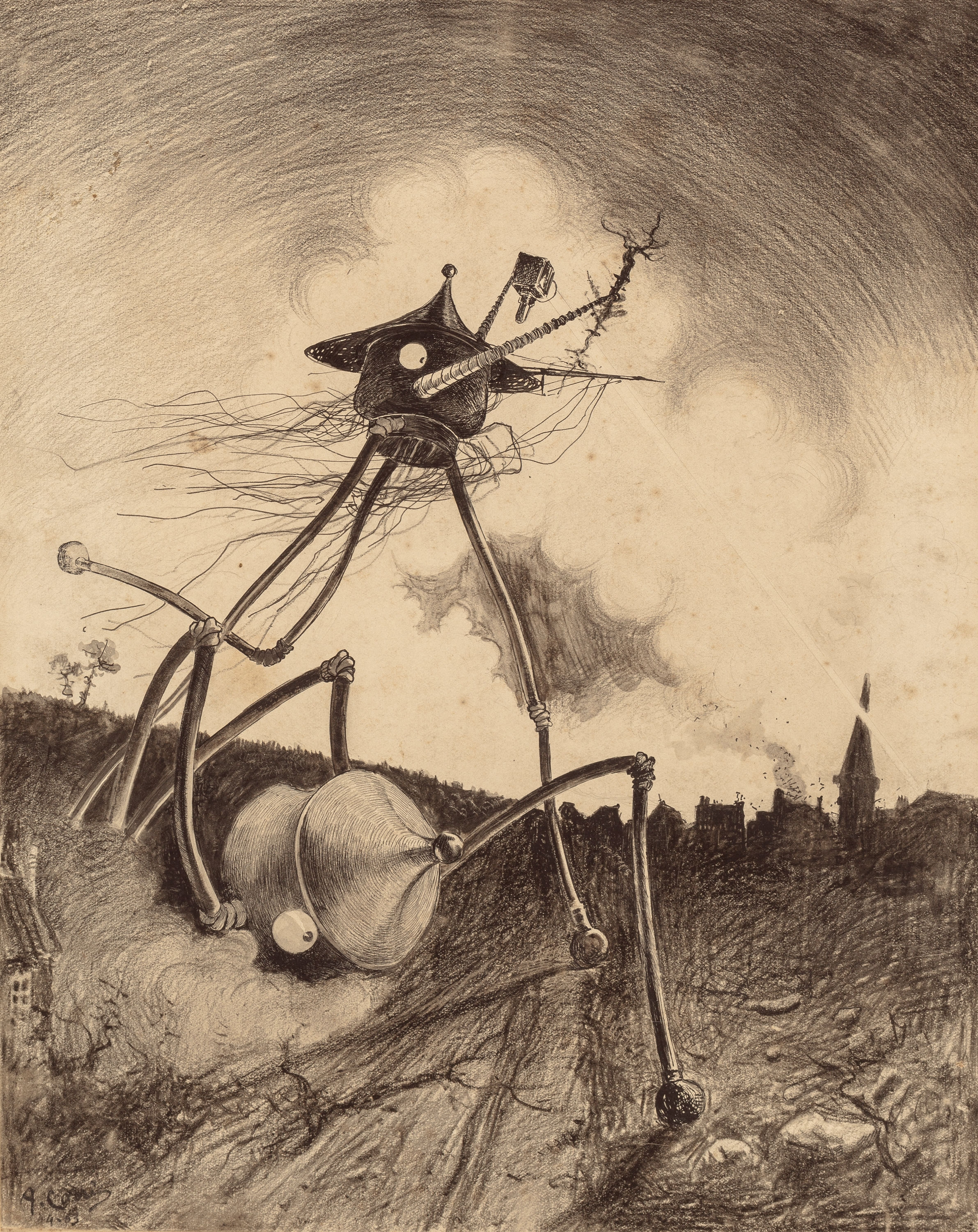
Martian fighting machines in action (Henrique Alvim Corrêa 1906)

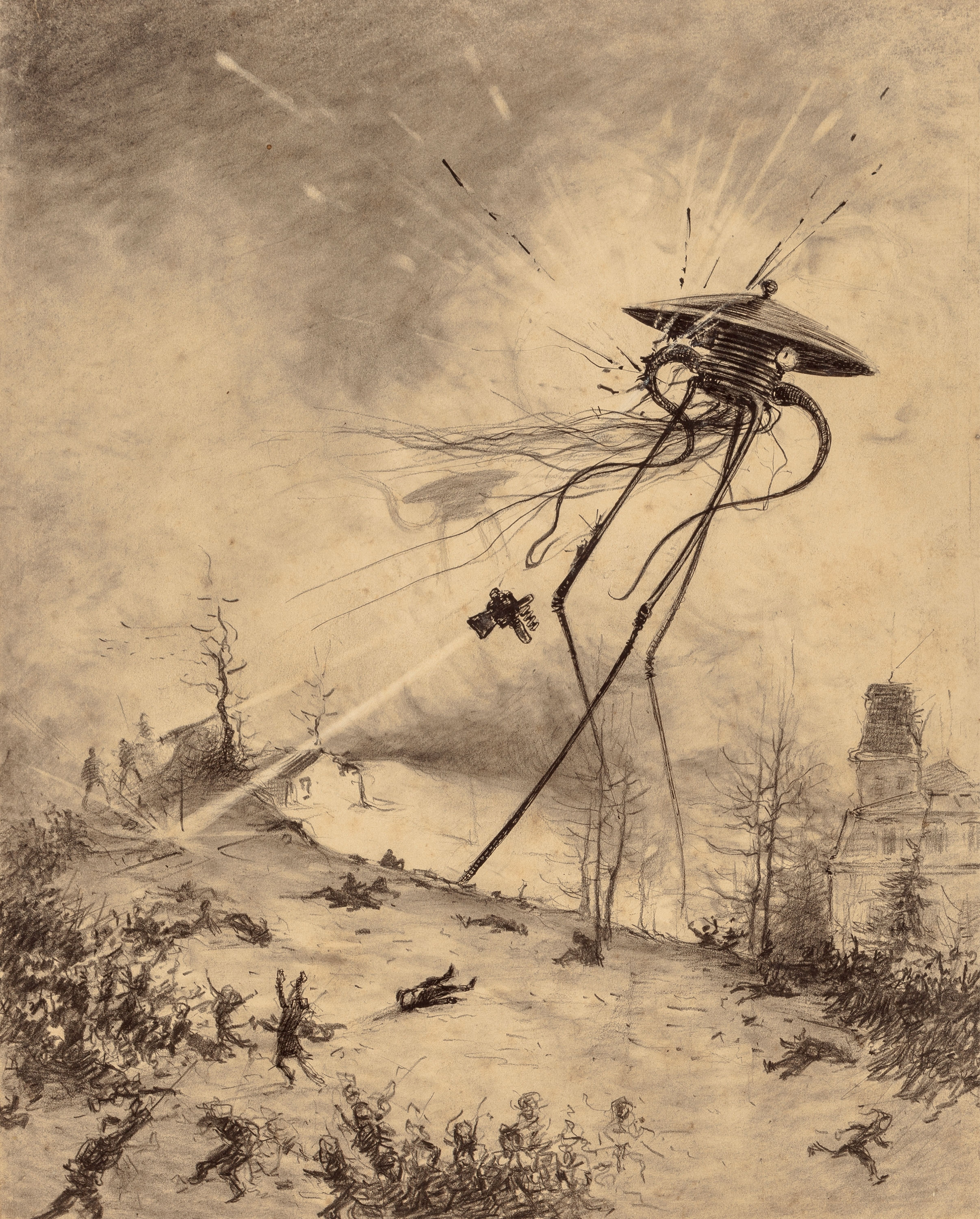
Martian fighting machine struck by a shell (Henrique Alvim Corrêa 1906)

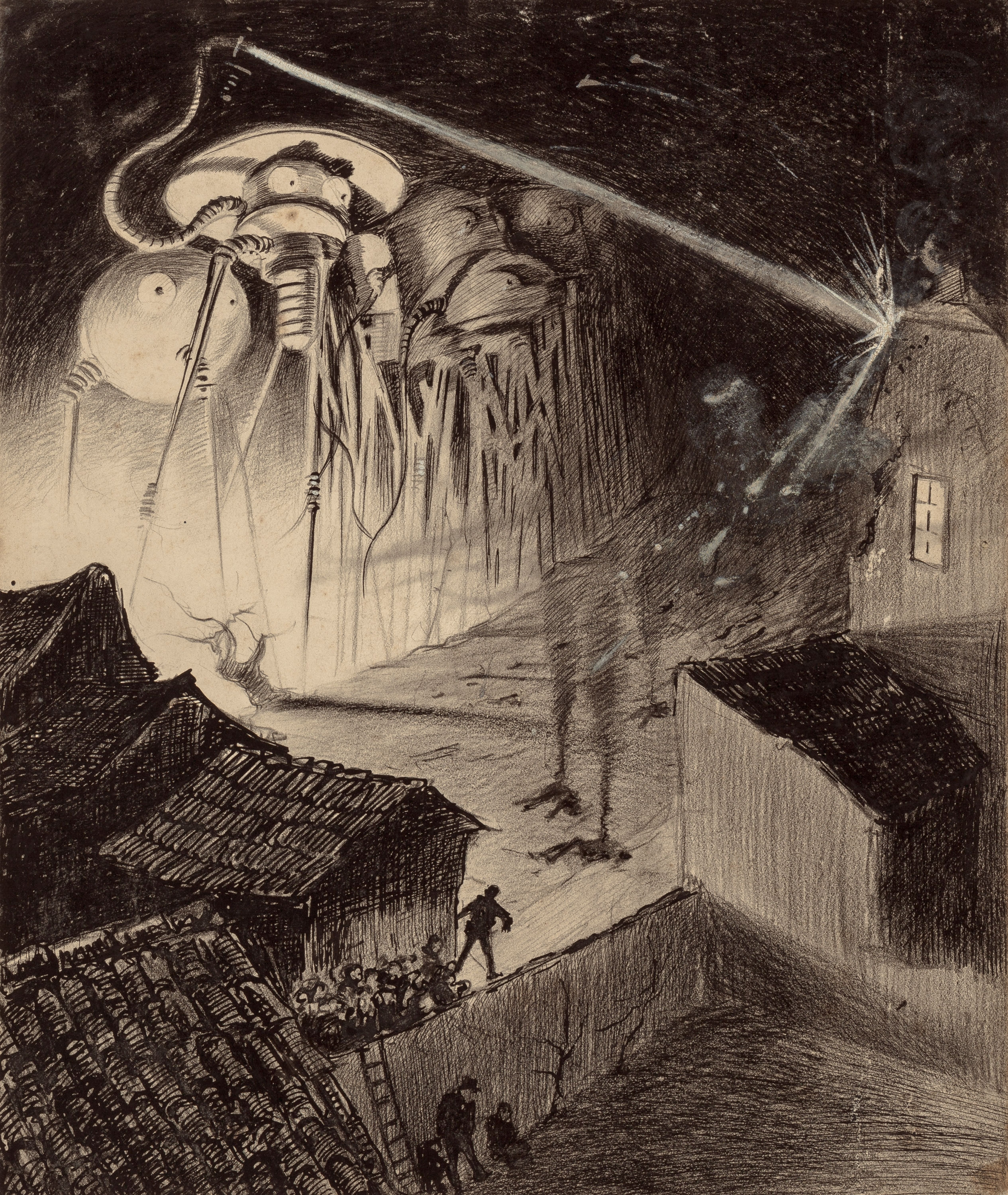
Martian fighting machine blasts a house (Henrique Alvim Corrêa 1906)

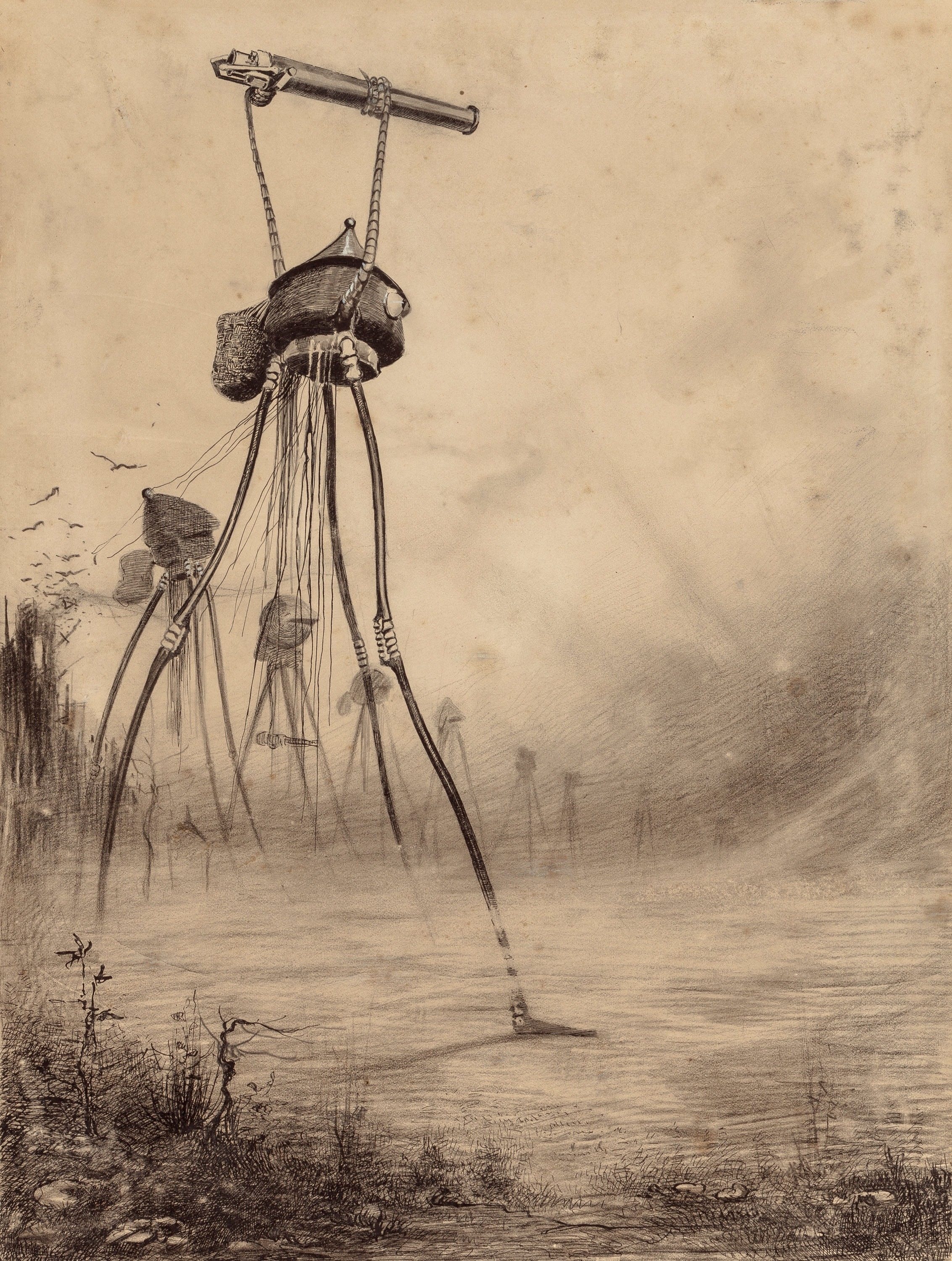
Martian fighting machine fires the black smoke (Henrique Alvim Corrêa 1906)

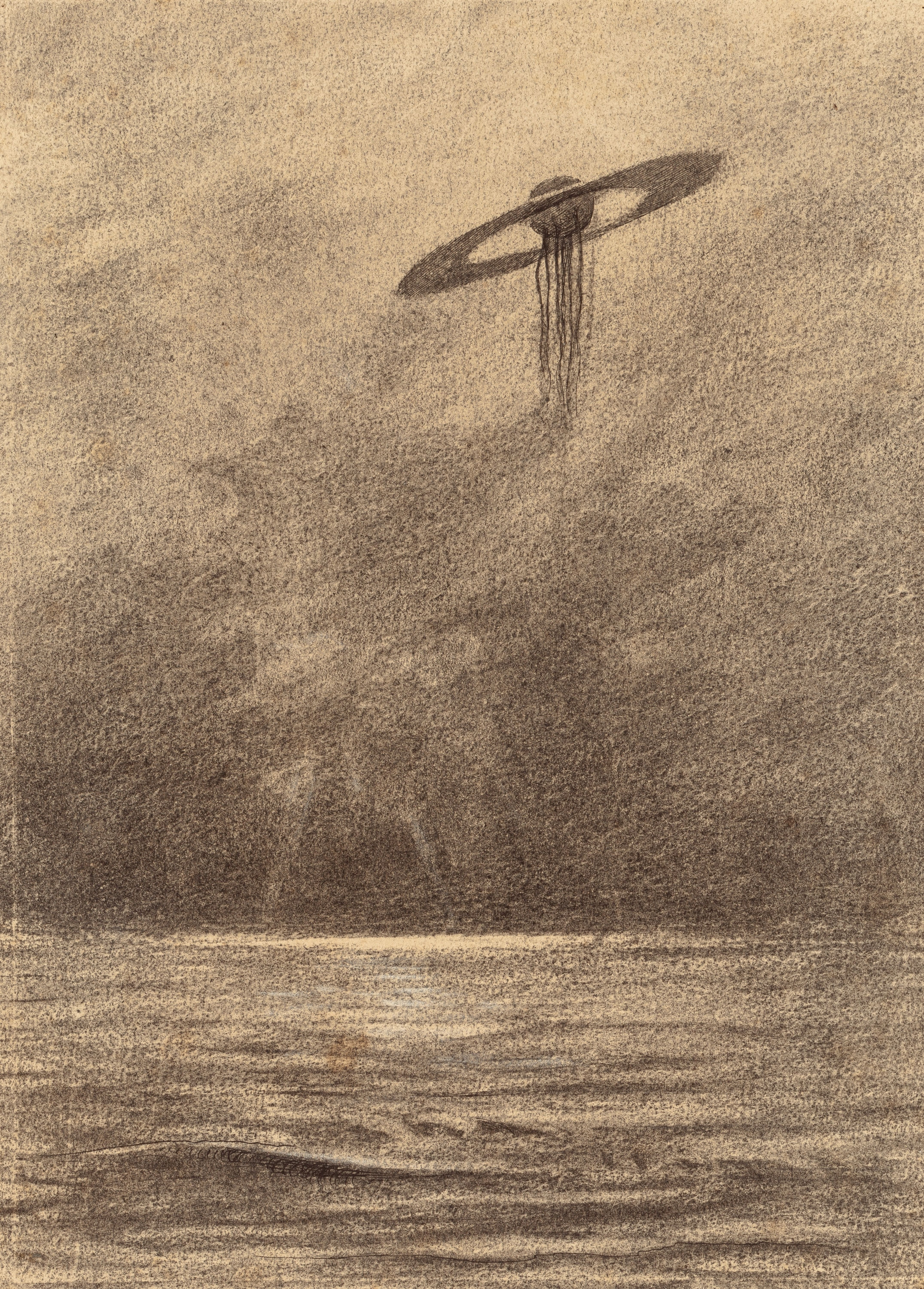
A Flying Machine approaches HMS Thunder Child. (Henrique Alvim Corrêa 1906)

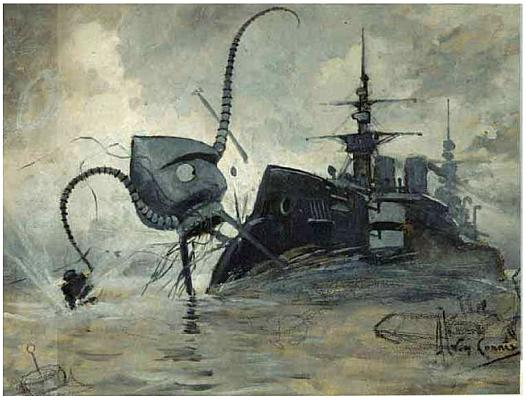
The warship HMS Thunder Child confronts a Martian fighting machine (Henrique Alvim Corrêa 1906)

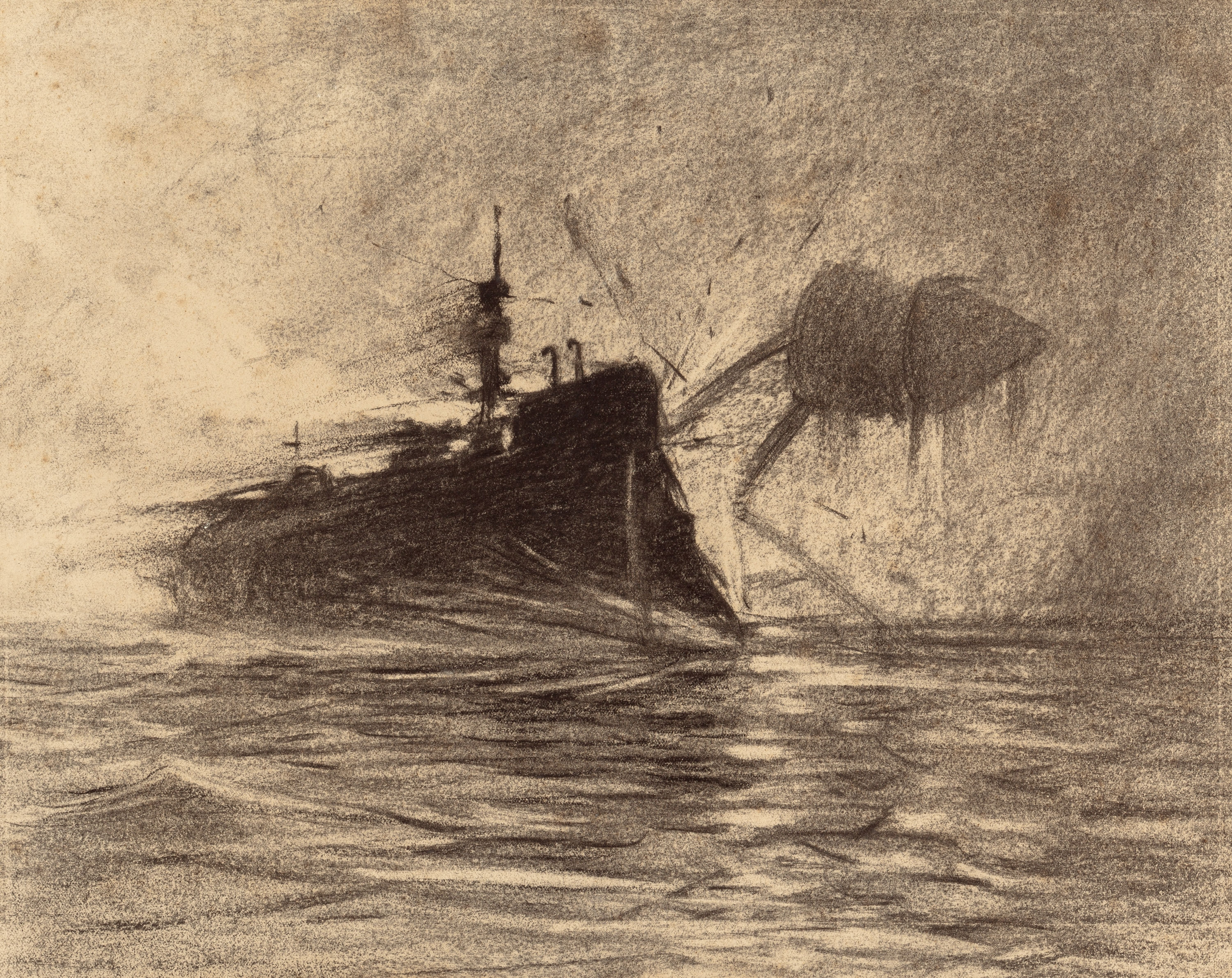
The Thunder Child downs a Tripod, only to get destroyed by them soon after.

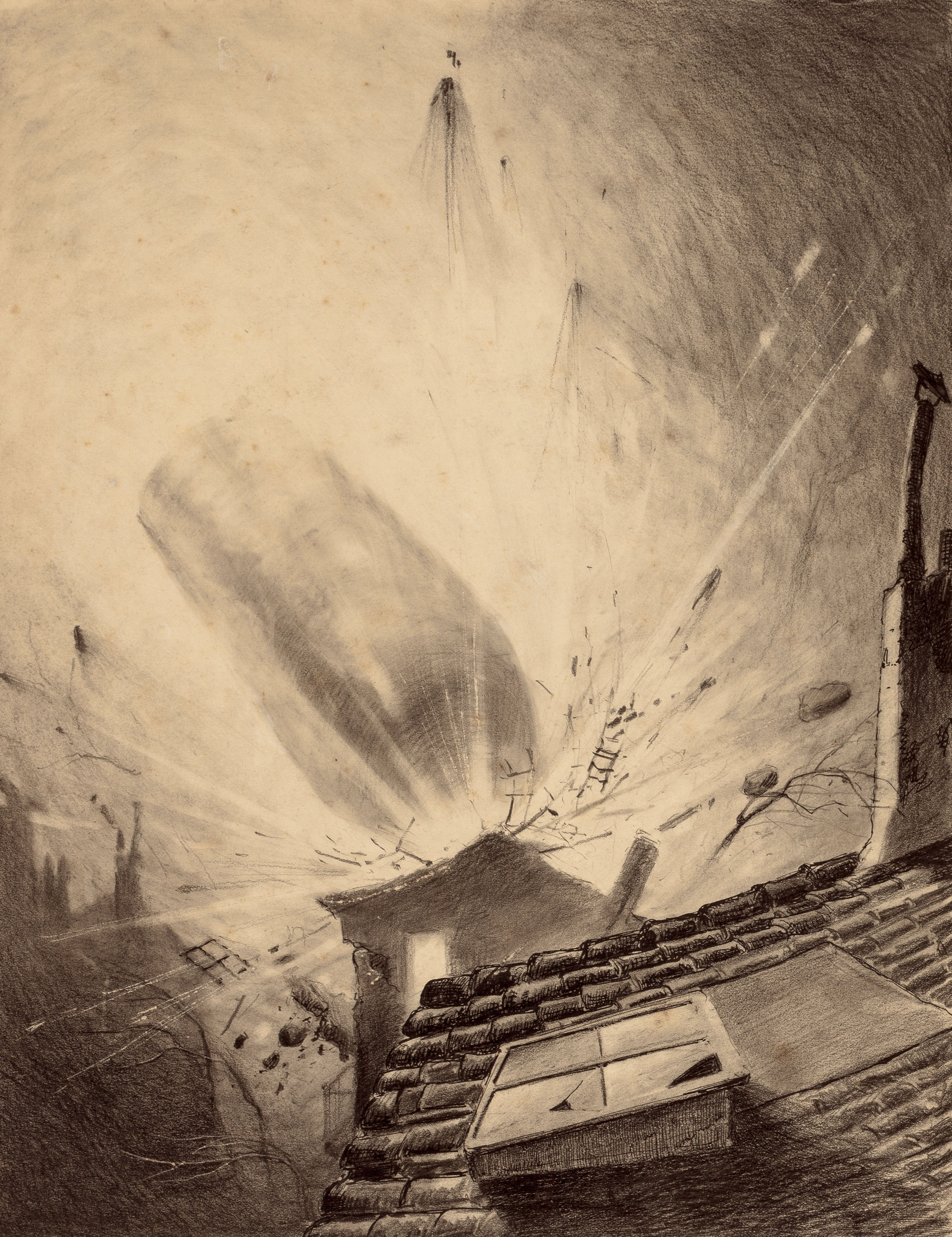
Martian cylinder strikes the house where the narrator and the curate took refuge (Henrique Alvim Corrêa 1906)

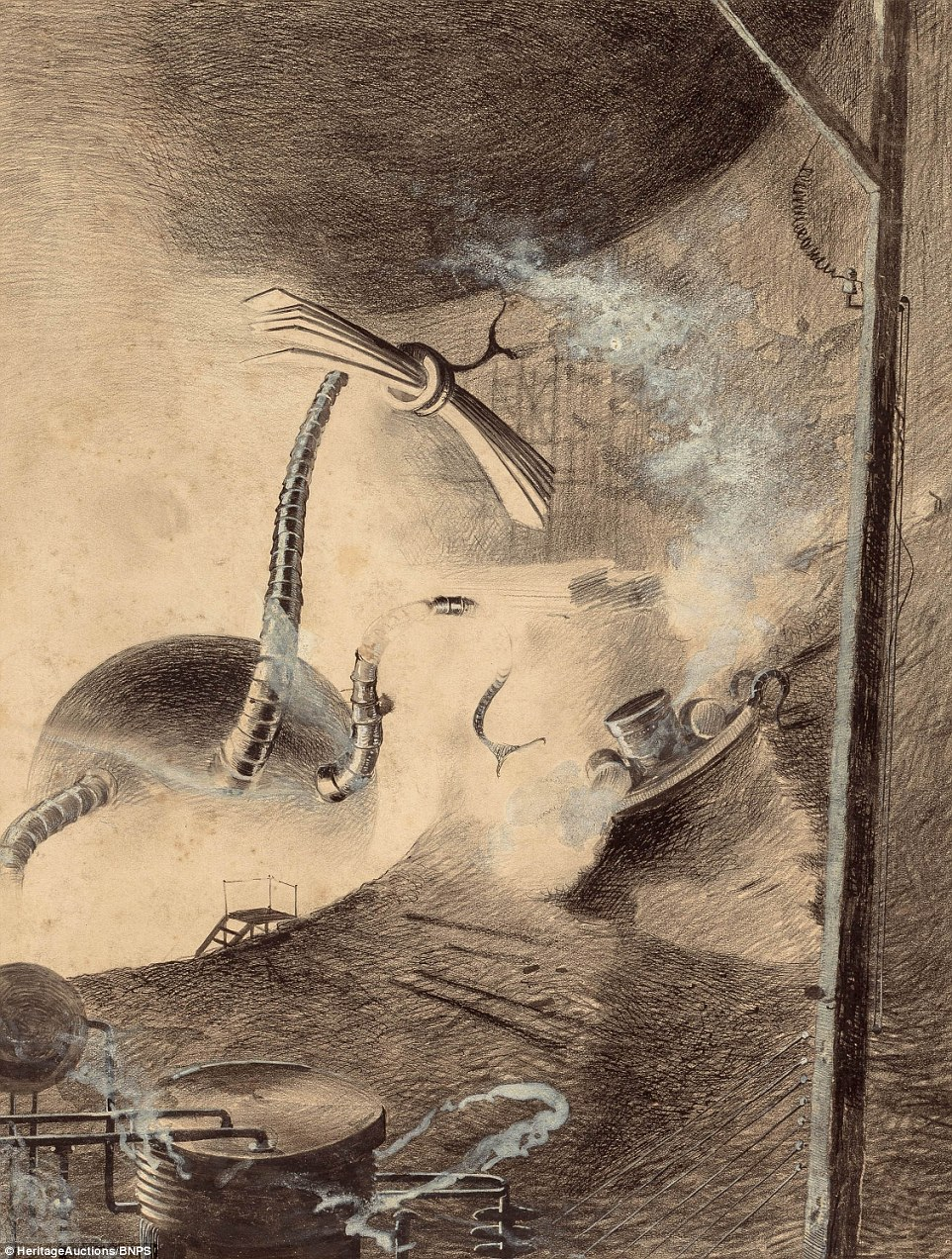
A Martian handling machine used for construction and assembly tasks (Henrique Alvim Corrêa 1906)

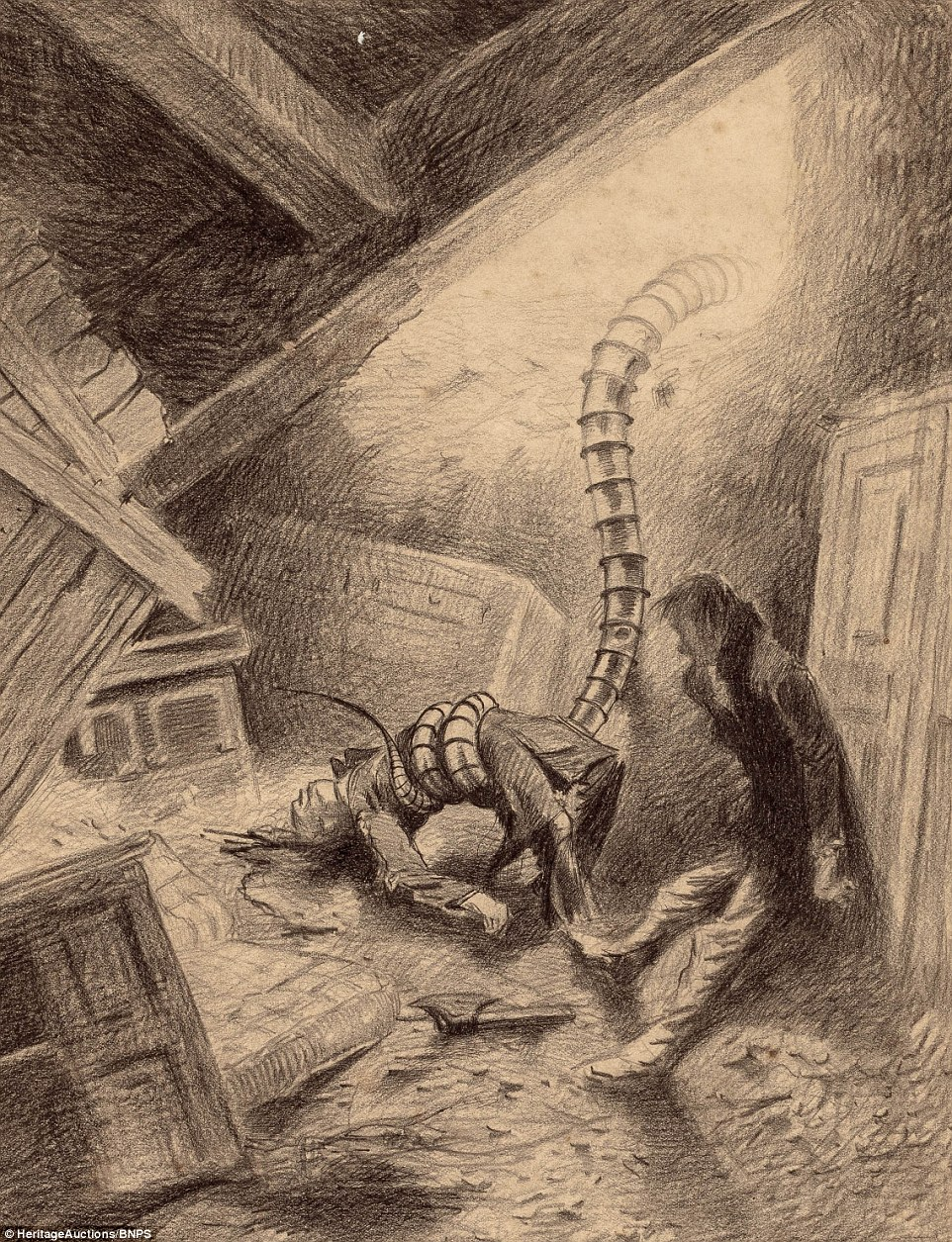
Martians grab the curate with a mechanical tentacle (Henrique Alvim Corrêa 1906)

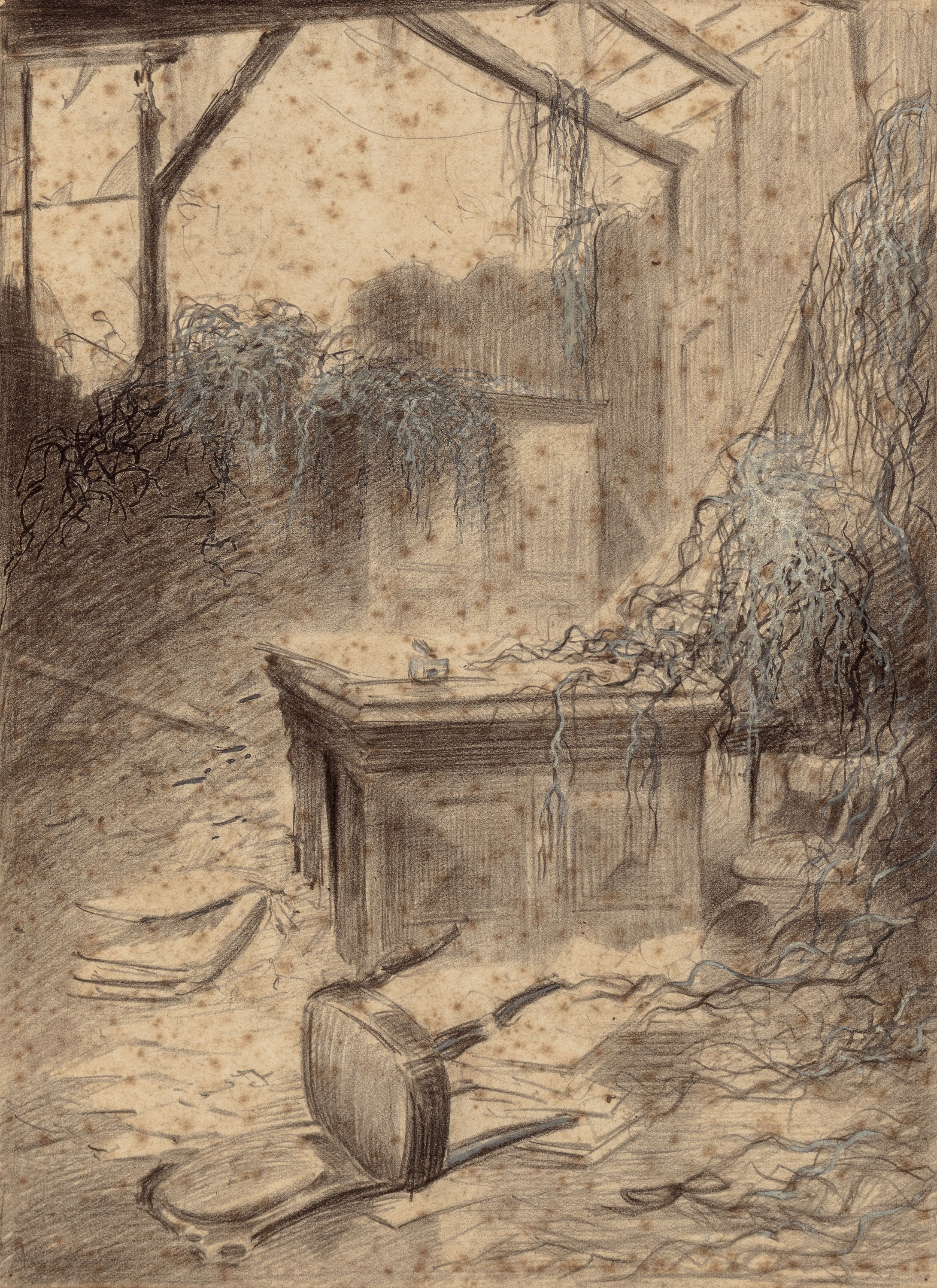
Spreading Martian red weed (Henrique Alvim Corrêa 1906)

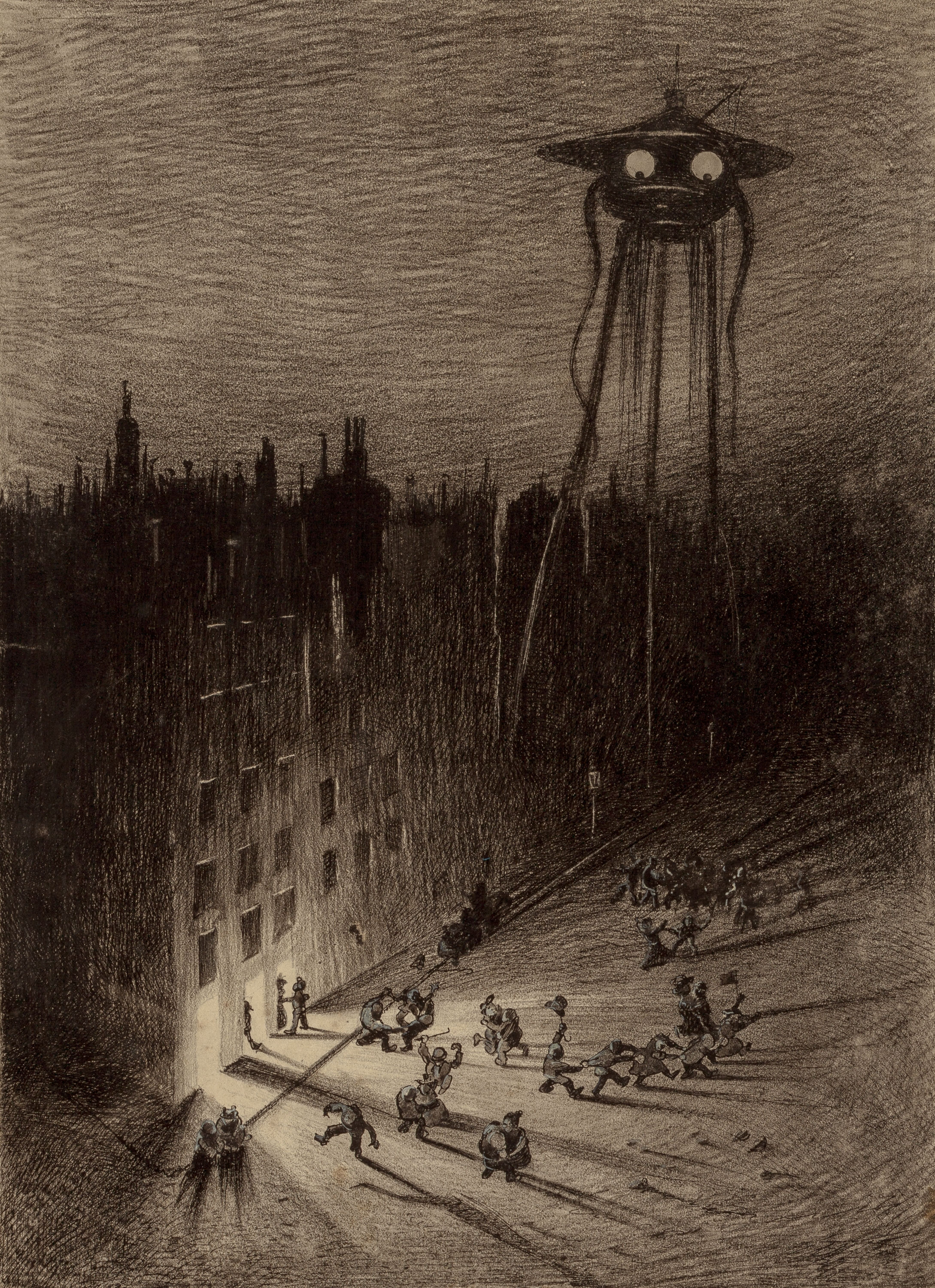
Martian viewing a Drunken Crowd. (Henrique Alvim Corrêa 1906)

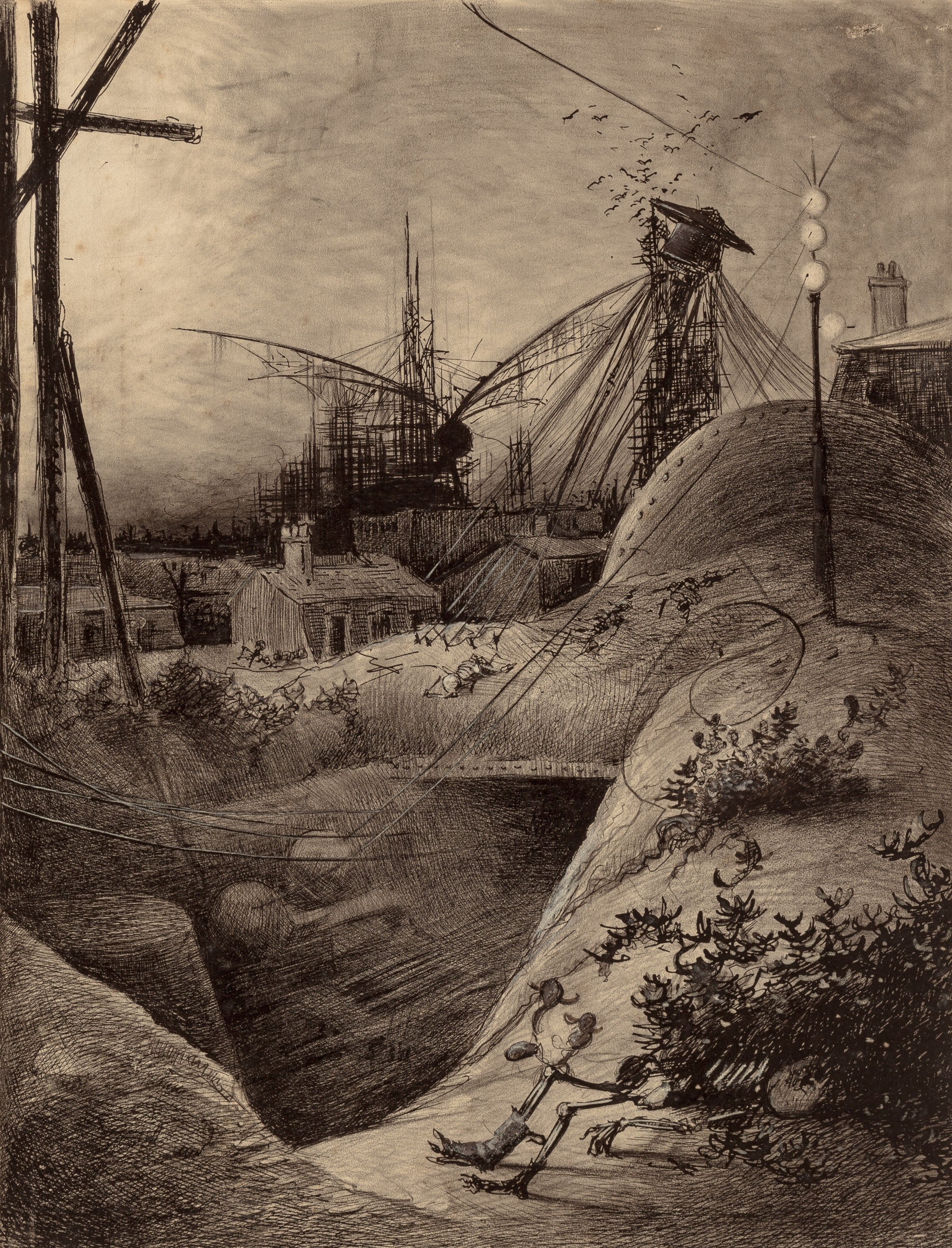
London in ruins after the Martian attack (Henrique Alvim Corrêa 1906)

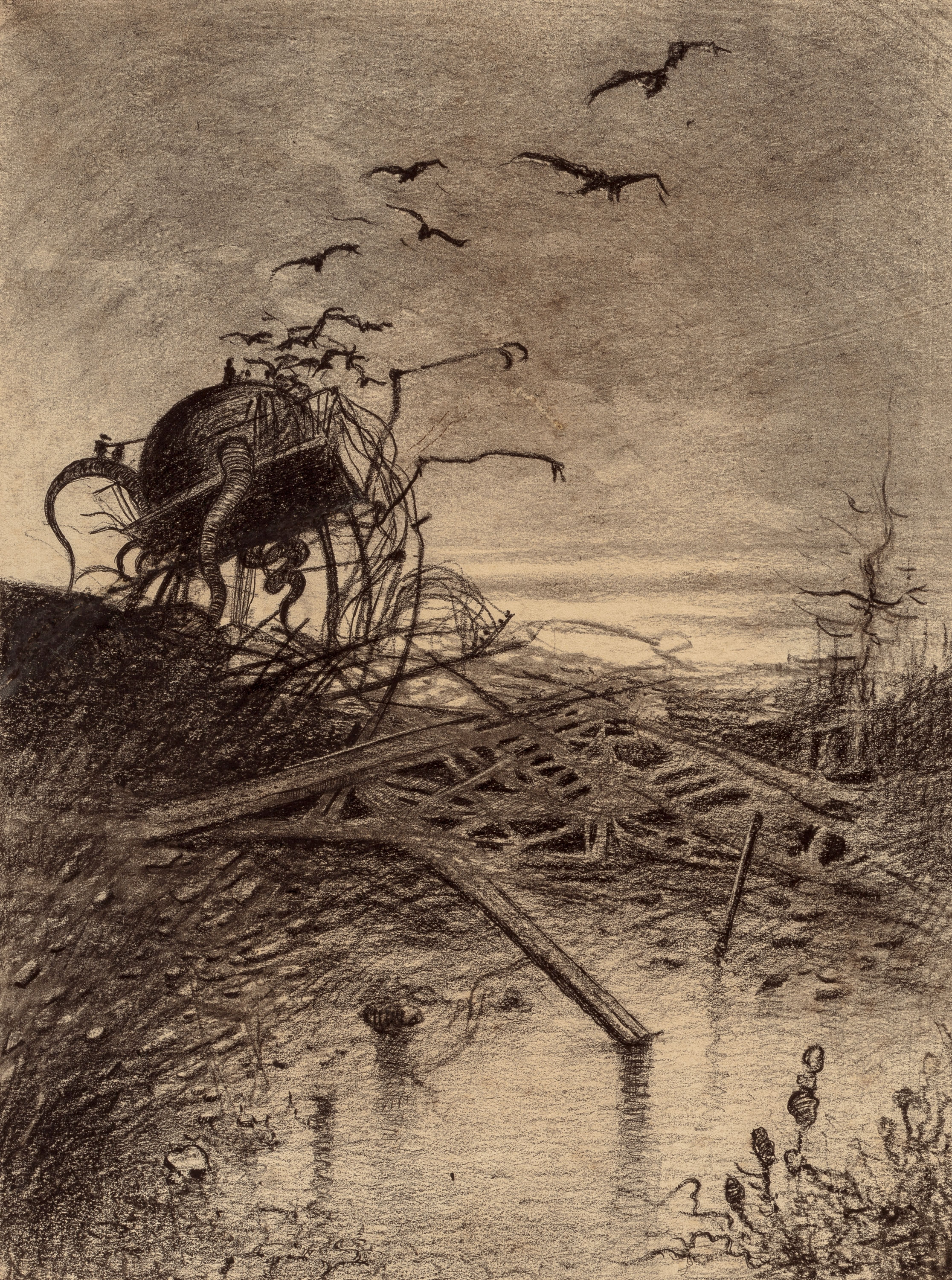
An abandoned Handling Machine, plundered by Crows. (Henrique Alvim Corrêa 1906)

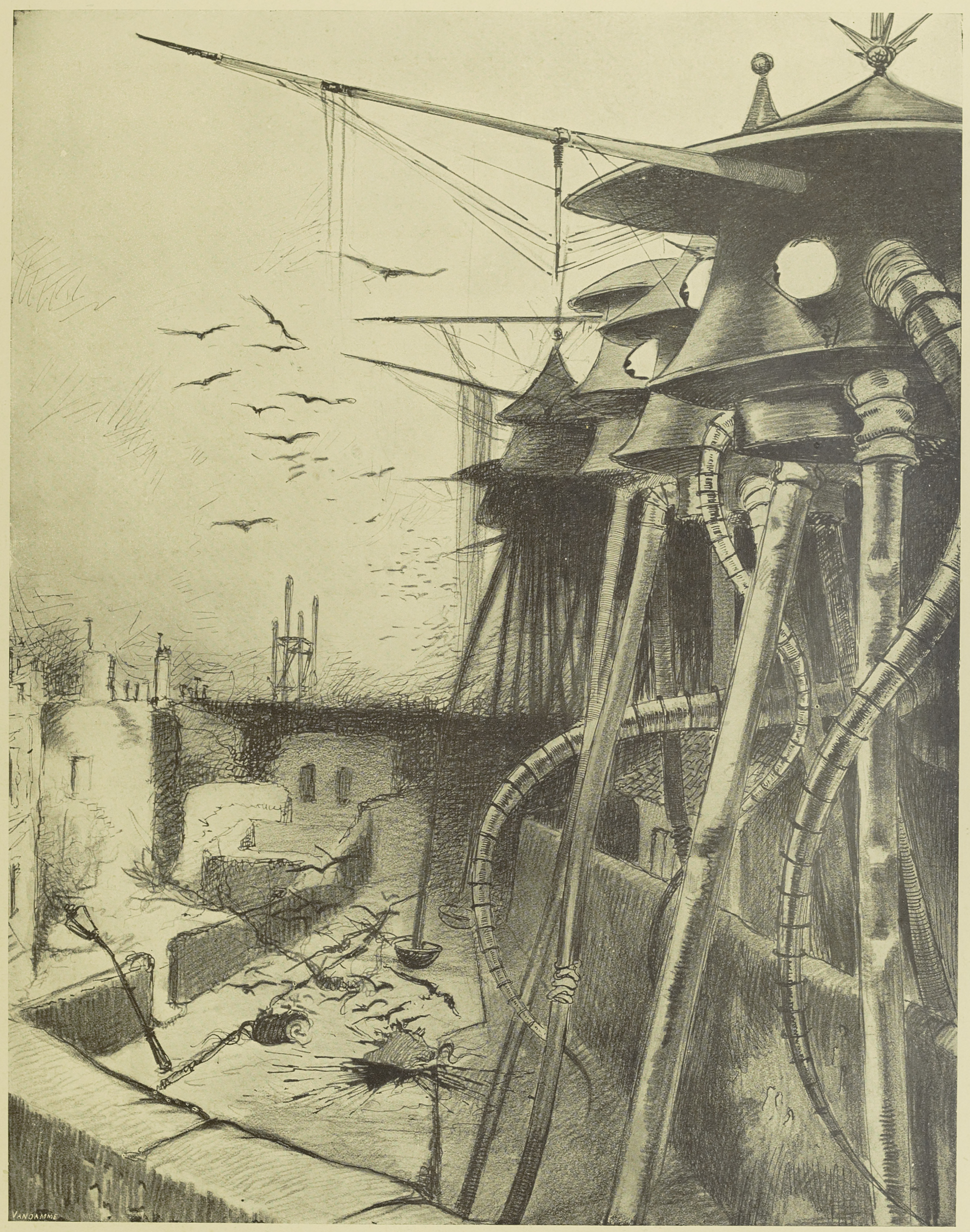
The fighting machines stand immobile in London as birds scavenge dead Martians (Henrique Alvim Corrêa 1906)

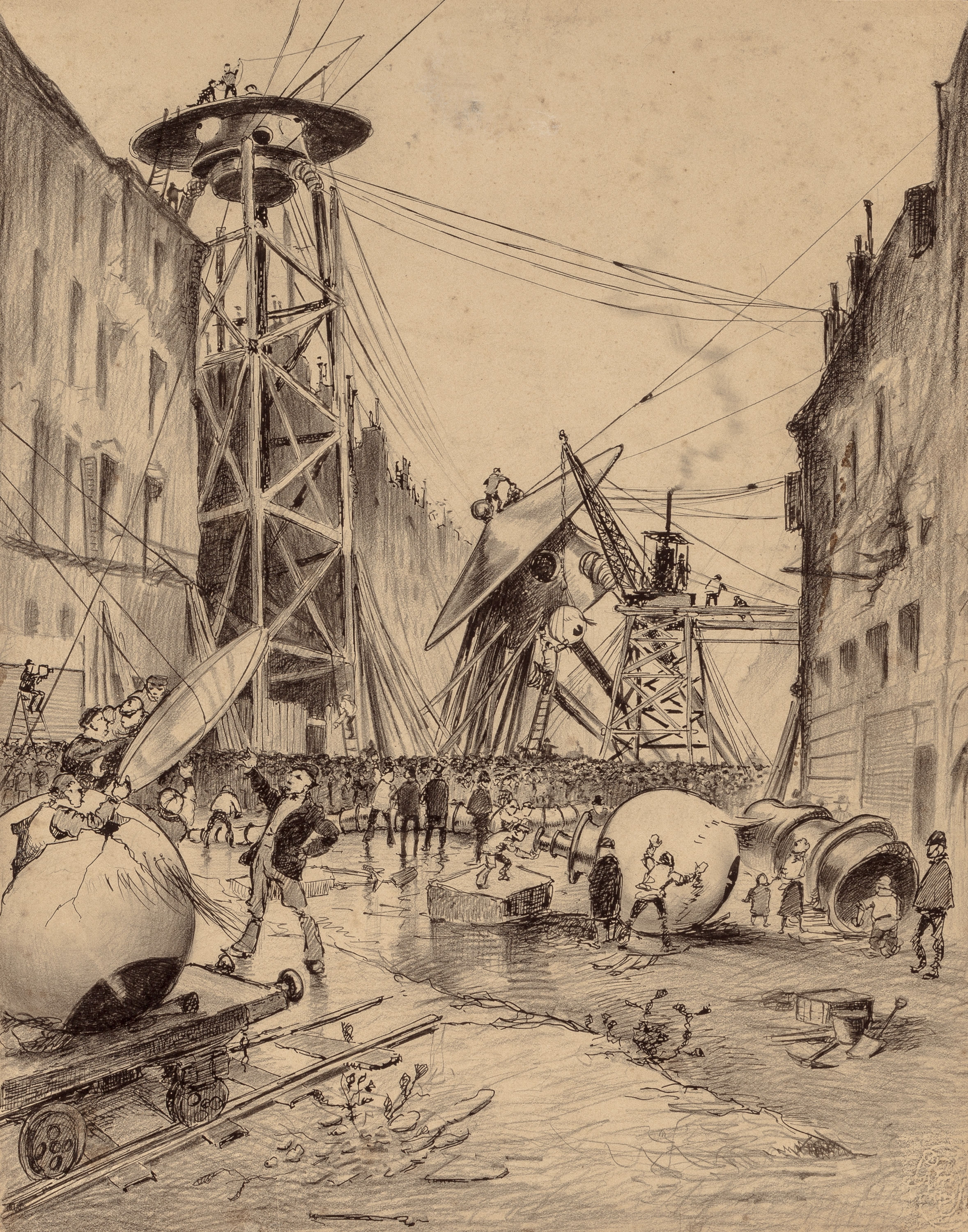
Humans examine the advanced war machines left after the death of the Martians (Henrique Alvim Corrêa 1906)

== See also ==
- Extraterrestrials in fiction
- Deus ex machina – Device to resolve the plot of a dramatic work
- Le Monde's 100 Books of the Century
- The Massacre of Mankind – An authorised sequel
- The Second Invasion from Mars – 1968 novel by Arkadi and Boris Strugatsky
- The Space Machine – 1976 novel by Christopher Priest
- The Germ Growers
- The Crystal Egg A commonly accepted prequel to novel.
- Two Planets
- Alien Invasion

== Sources ==
- Batchelor, John (1985). H.G. Wells. Cambridge University Press. ISBN 0-521-27804-X. OL 2854973M.
- Coren, Michael (1993) The Invisible Man: The Life and Liberties of H.G. Wells's. Publisher: Random House of Canada. ISBN 0-394-22252-0
- Gosling, John. Waging the War of the Worlds. Jefferson, North Carolina, McFarland, 2009. Paperback, ISBN 0-7864-4105-4.
- Guthke, Karl S. (1990). The Last Frontier: Imagining Other Worlds from the Copernican Revolution to Modern Science Fiction. Translated by Atkins, Helen. Ithaca: Cornell University Press. ISBN 978-0-8014-9727-8.
- Parrinder, Patrick (1997). H.G. Wells: The Critical Heritage. Routledge. ISBN 978-0-415-15910-4. OL 7484625M.
  - —— (2000). Learning from Other Worlds: Estrangement, Cognition, and the Politics of Science Fiction and Utopia. Liverpool University Press. ISBN 0-8532-3574-0. OL 22421185M.
- Roth, Christopher F. (2005) "Ufology as Anthropology: Race, Extraterrestrials, and the Occult." In E.T. Culture: Anthropology in Outerspaces, ed. by Debbora Battaglia. Durham, N.C.: Duke University Press.
- Yeffeth, Glenn (Editor) (2005) The War of the Worlds: Fresh Perspectives on the H. G. Wells Classic. Publisher: Benbella Books. ISBN 1-932100-55-5
