= Extraterrestrials in fiction =

Fictional depictions of extraterrestrial life

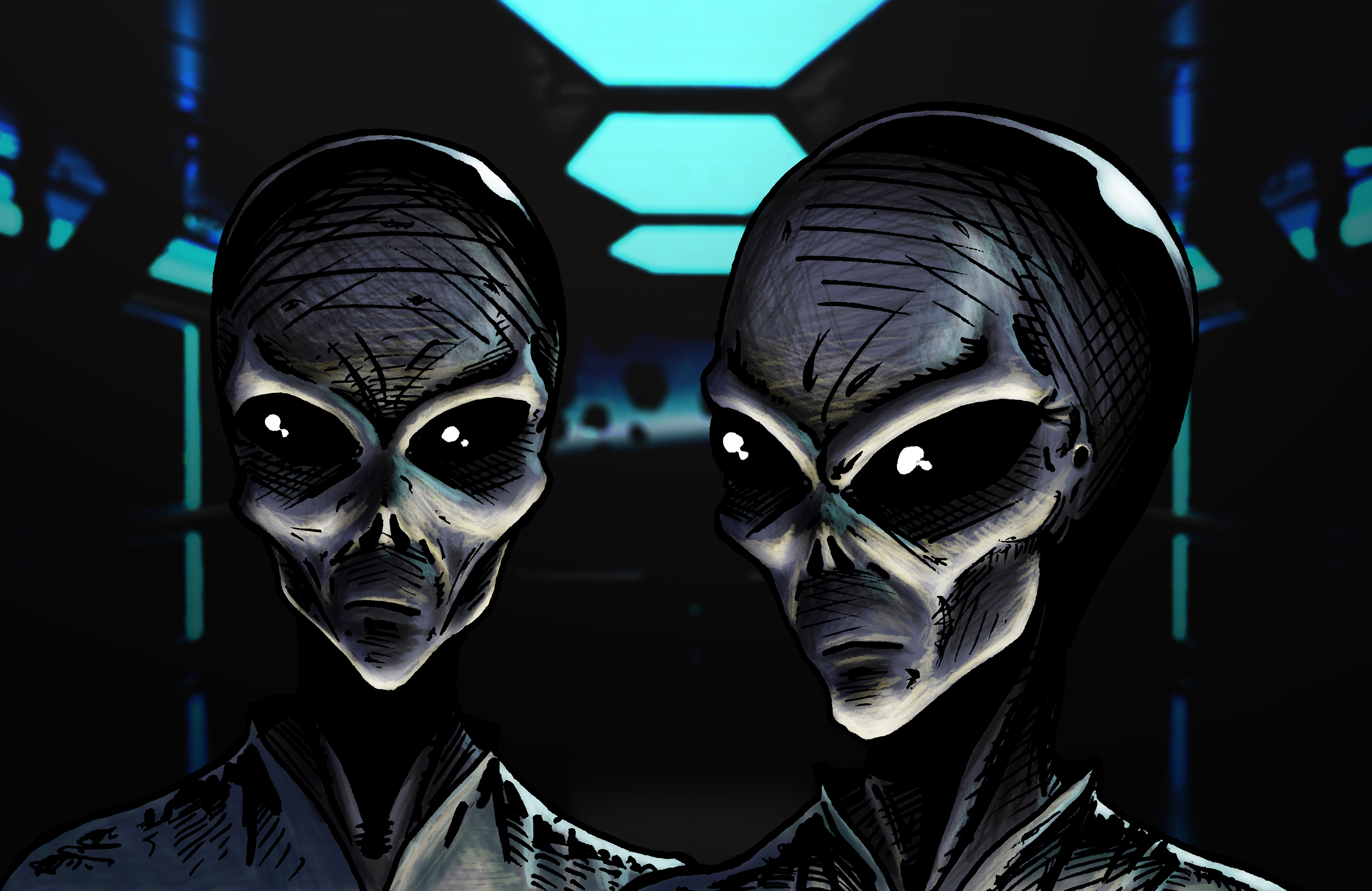
- Grey aliens are a common way to depict extraterrestrials in fiction.

Creature information
- Other name(s): Aliens, space aliens
- Grouping: Science fiction
- Similar entities: Cryptids

An extraterrestrial or alien is a lifeform that does not originate on Earth. Extraterrestrials are a common theme in modern science fiction but also appear in much earlier works.

== History ==
=== Antiquity ===
The 2nd century writer of satires, Lucian, in his True History claims to have visited the Moon when his ship was sent up by a fountain, which was peopled and at war with the people of the Sun over colonisation of the Morning Star.

The way people have thought about extraterrestrials is tied to the development of actual sciences. One of the first steps in the history of astronomy was to realize that the objects seen in the night sky were not gods or lights, but physical objects like Earth. This notion was followed by the one that celestial objects should be inhabited as well. However, when people thought about such extraterrestrials, they thought of them simply as people, indistinguishable from humans. As people had never considered a scientific explanation for the origin of humankind or its relation with other lifeforms, any hypothetical rational lifeforms had by necessity to be humans. Even in mythology, all deities are mostly humanlike. For example, Voltaire's Micromégas (1752) features people from Saturn, who are simply of higher proportions. Johannes Kepler's Somnium (1634), Francis Godwin's The Man in the Moone (1638), Cyrano de Bergerac's Les estats et empires de le lune (1657) and others all thought of selenites that differ from humanity only in culture or habits. Few writers ventured beyond anthropomorphic designs, some exceptions were Bergerac's Les estats et empires du soleil and Miles Wilson's The History of Israel Jobson, the Wandering Jew (1757).

=== 19th century ===
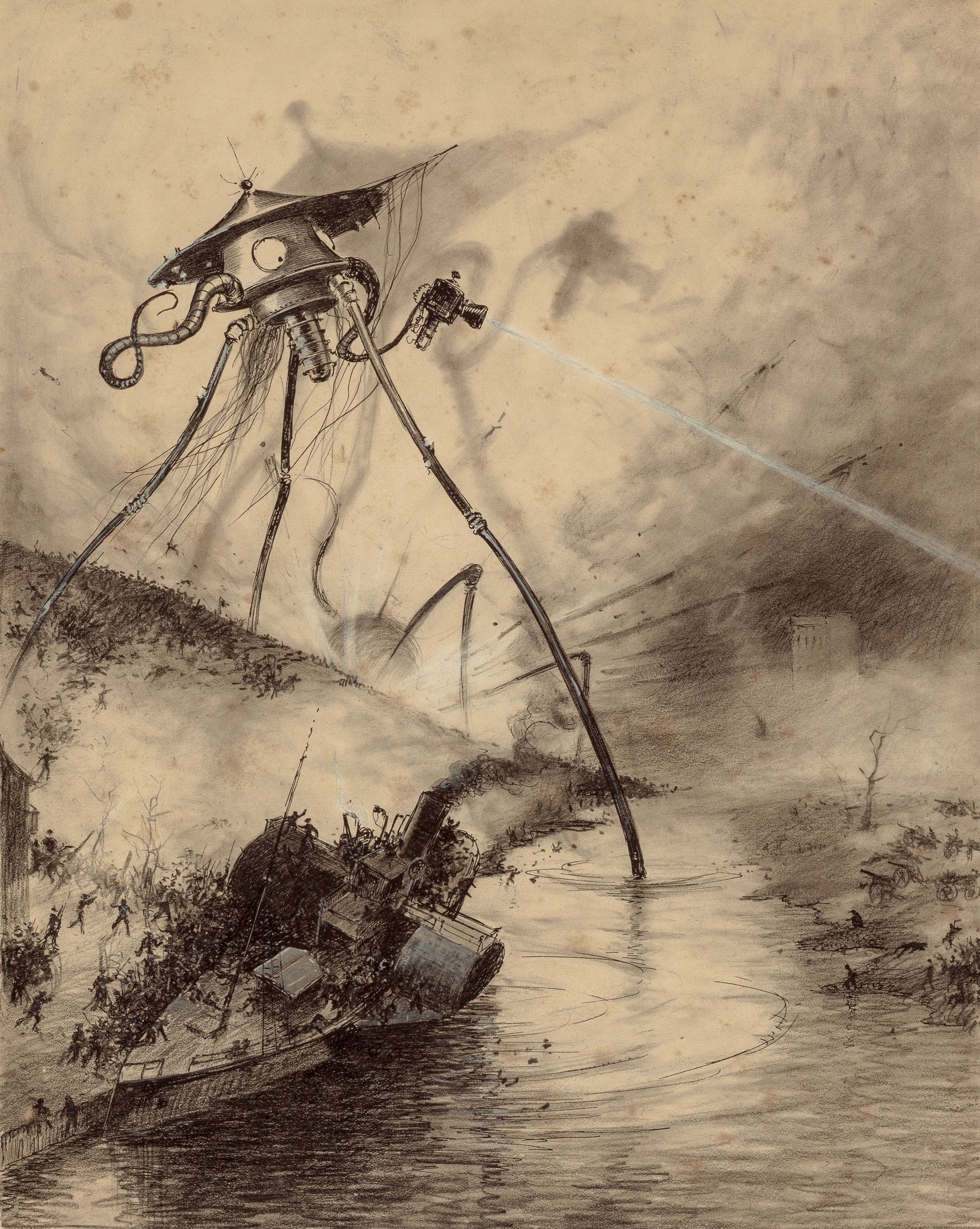
Martian controlled Fighting Machine (Tripod), from H. G. Wells's 1898 novel The War of the Worlds

People's view of alien life was changed by the 1859 book On the Origin of Species by Charles Darwin, which proposed the theory of evolution. This book caused a revolution in fiction as much as it did in science, as authors began to imagine extraterrestrial races completely different from human beings. With the rationale that evolution in other worlds may take completely different directions than on Earth, aliens began to be described as a-human creatures. Usually, authors used features from other animals, such as insects, crabs, octopuses, and squids. One of the first works featuring genuinely alien lifeforms was Camille Flammarion's non-fiction book Les mondes imaginaires et les mondes réels (1864) and his novel Lumen (1887). He described sentient trees, tentacled seal-like creatures pushing against a harsh atmosphere, and life made of silicon and magnesium. As the 1890s dawned, so did the genre of the alien invasion. With the 1892 novel The Germ Growers by Robert Potter. It’s aliens were blob-like shapeshifters. Some other aliens are the octopean Martians from H. G. Wells's The War of the Worlds (1898), the Selenites from Wells's The First Men in the Moon (1901), the birdlike Tweel from Stanley G. Weinbaum's A Martian Odyssey (1934) and even a sentient star in Olaf Stapledon's Star Maker (1937). However, most aliens in works of the era were still basically humans, as the Martians from Hugh MacColl's Mr. Stranger's Sealed Packet (1889), Kurd Lasswitz’s Two Planets, Robert Cromie's A Plunge into Space (1890), and the Venusians from Milton Worth Ramsey's Six Thousand Years Hence (1891).

The War of the Worlds not only used Darwinian evolution to explain its non-humanoid aliens, but also explored the implications of the theory of evolution towards alien lifeforms. Martians appear as an apex predator above even humans, a threat to the survival of the species. However, they struggle against Earth's higher gravity and thicker atmosphere, for which they were not adapted to, and eventually succumb to simple bacteria, as they lack immunity to them. The story also worked as a critique of British imperialism, by inverting it, and popularized the tropes of the alien invasion and the depiction of extraterrestrials as monsters. Wells also wrote The First Men in the Moon, the first attempt to describe in detail the workings of an alien civilization. He based the roles of the Selenites in those of an ant colony, although those roles are more the result of social structures rather than genetic design. However, his work still relied in satire and had more in common with Jonathan Swift's Gulliver's Travels (1726) than with the alien civilizations seen in later science fiction works.

The new literary genre of science fiction explored both extraterrestrials and space exploration, as in From the Earth to the Moon (1865) and Around the Moon (1870) by Jules Verne.

=== Early 20th century ===
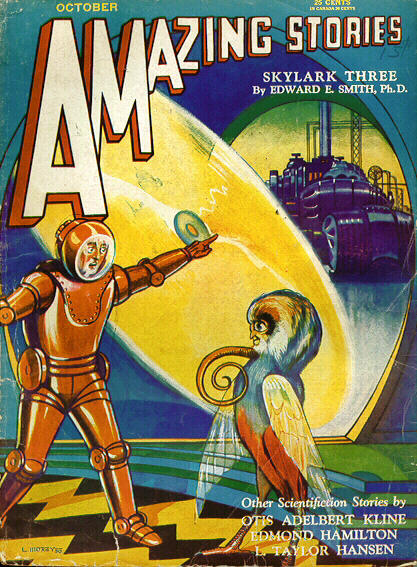
A human encounter with an alien on the cover to Amazing Stories

Pulp magazines emerged as a new venue for science fiction. Many stories were set in worlds with quasi-human aliens, menaced by dangerous monsters and beautiful women serving as a love interest for the hero. This is the pattern of Ralph Milne Farley's The Radio Man (1924) and others. Pulps also featured monstrous alien invaders, in the style of The War of the Worlds. In the first space operas, such as those from Amazing Stories, good and evil aliens were clearly distinct: spider-like, octopoid, squidoid, and most reptilian aliens were villains, and humanoid, mammalian, and birdlike aliens were the good ones. It was also frequent for the classic trope of the alien invasion to be inverted, with humans conquering alien worlds instead; such stories were usually unapologetically genocidal.

Most aliens in pulp magazines originated from planets or moons of the Solar System, mainly Martians, Venusians, Jovians, and Mercurians. Aliens from Neptune and the moons of Jupiter and Saturn also appeared but were rare. The humanoid type was still the most frequent type of alien, despite evolution being fully accepted in the scientific community by this point. Stanley G. Weinbaum made a significant change in A Martian Odyssey (Wonder Stories), by designing a Martian ecosystem with native creatures, unlike the plants or animals from Earth. Such creation was largely free of satire, melodrama and other frequent tropes of the genre.

=== Modern times ===
A work that pioneered alien invasion in modern times was The Eternaut, by Argentine writer Héctor Germán Oesterheld. Influenced by the nuclear developments at that time, his work centers around an alien invasion in Buenos Aires, in a time when most science fiction works were set in the Global North, especially in the United States, The Eternaut served as a critique of imperialism, colonialism, and the military dictatorship in which Argentina was under at that moment. It depicts four kinds of aliens: the Cascarudos, similar to large insects, the Hand, human-like, the Gurbos, a kind of beast, and Them, who act in the shadows, representing the powers that be.

The Barney and Betty Hill incident took place in 1961 when the couple claimed that they were abducted by aliens and subjected to invasive experiments. It was among the first widely publicized claims of alien abduction. The description of the aliens made by the Hills, with oversized heads, big eyes, pale grey skin, and small noses captivated the public imagination and was later used by TV shows and films. This started the grey alien archetype. According to Wade Roush, a science and technology writer, "The standard depiction of aliens at that point became the little grey man. So, when Steven Spielberg came along and made probably what are the two most influential movies about aliens – Close Encounters of the Third Kind, and E.T. the Extra-Terrestrial – the aliens and those movies were both basically variations on the 1950s and 1960s little green or little grey man image".

The advent of TV and films, with extraterrestrials played by actors, toned down the fantasy. For budget reasons, humanlike aliens with just some specific non-human body features became the new standard. This is especially noticeable in the Star Trek franchise. Star Trek started a golden age of science fiction in the second half of the 20th century, alongside Star Wars, which mixed science fiction with tropes from mythological stories, such as the journey of the hero, the dichotomy of good and evil, and redemption. Alien, a film about an alien that attacks a group of astronauts, was released in 1979. The three works became franchises with several sequels and related media, as a result of the public's continuing interest in outer space.

The way to depict aliens changed again since the 1990s with the advent of computer-generated imagery (CGI), and later on as CGI became more effective and less expensive, as it allows to generate bizarre lifeforms without being constrained to actors with costumes or mechanical effects.

== Types ==
Extraterrestrials in fiction are portrayed in several different ways. Extraterrestrial intelligence may be lower, similar, higher or significantly higher than that of humans, or completely alien and impossible to be compared. Their biological aspect may be humanoid, may be similar or include features of other Earth species, or have weird forms. In some cases, such weirdness may lead to the human characters to initially fail to recognize the aliens as such. Their attitude towards humanity may be hostile, they can be invaders in an alien invasion, enemies in a piece fully set in space, or judges of humanity. They may also be friendly, and show up as teachers, allies, victims of exploitation by humans, or by secret overseers watching and shepherding humanity in secrecy since antiquity. Or they may be completely uninterested in interacting with humanity in any significant capacity.

Although most extraterrestrials come from other planets, others may also be from Earth, coming from areas that have not been explored. Such aliens may come from under the sea, from the sky, from underground (in some cases from a hollow Earth), or from more exotic locations such as other dimensions, parallel worlds, or alternate history scenarios. However, most of those extraterrestrials work just as the ones from outer space.

== See also ==
- Parasites in fiction
- List of fictional extraterrestrials
- List of films featuring extraterrestrials
- List of humanoid aliens
- Extrasolar planets in fiction
- Fictional planets of the Solar System
- Mercury in fiction
- Venus in fiction
- Moon in science fiction
- Mars in fiction
- Jupiter in fiction
- Saturn in fiction
- Uranus in fiction
- Neptune in fiction
- Pluto in fiction
- First contact (science fiction)

== Bibliography ==
- Leyva, Manuel Lozano (2017). La exploración del espacio [Space exploration] (in Spanish). Spain: RBA Coleccionables. ISBN 978-84-473-8788-5.
