= Biological warfare in popular culture =

The international biological hazard symbol.

Biological warfare (BW)—also known as bacteriological warfare, or germ warfare—has appeared in fiction since at least the 1880s. The theme became more widespread towards the end of the 1900s as the concept of genetic engineering grew in popularity. Targets of bioweapons in fiction include humanity as a whole, genetically distinct subsets thereof, plants including important crops, and inanimate substances.

== History ==
Early examples of the concept of bacteriological warfare in fiction include Fanny Stevenson and Robert Louis Stevenson's 1885 book The Dynamiter and H. G. Wells's 1894 short story "The Stolen Bacillus", where anarchists seek to attack British cities with typhoid and cholera, respectively. The first fictional disease designed to be used as a weapon appeared in the 1892 novel The Germ Growers by Robert Potter. Intentionally created diseases became more common in fiction towards the end of the 1900s as the concept of genetic engineering grew in popularity. Cultural depictions of biological as well as chemical warfare has been proposed as a contributing cause to anthrax hoaxes.

== Biological diversity ==
In science fiction, biological agents are sometimes extraterrestrial in origin; examples include Jack Finney's 1955 novel The Body Snatchers and Michael Crichton's 1969 novel The Andromeda Strain. Besides microorganisms, fictional biological weapons also come in the form of larger hostile creatures, as in the 1979 film Alien. A biological weapon with a mind-altering rather than deadly effect appears in James Herbert's 1975 novel The Fog.

== Targets ==
Biological weapons may target all humans indiscriminately, as in Chelsea Quinn Yarbro's 1976 novel Time of the Fourth Horseman, where the intention is to prevent human overpopulation. David Langford, in The Science in Science Fiction, notes that this carries significant risks in a war scenario as the contagion may spread back to the deploying side and wreak equal havoc there. The concept of adjusting the weapons' properties to only target specific racial groups, or other genetically distinct populations, has also been explored in fiction. In Frank Herbert's 1982 novel The White Plague, the titular disease selectively kills women while men who are infected remain unharmed.

Besides humans, other species such as important crops may be targeted instead—Langford writes that this, too, can be just as destructive to the attacking side as to their foe, but that this need not be the case if it is possible to selectively target crops that the other side relies more heavily on. In H. G. Wells's 1897 novel The War of the Worlds, the Martians that invade Earth bring a red weed that acts as an invasive species and displaces the native plant life, while in John Christopher's 1956 novel The Death of Grass and its 1970 film adaptation No Blade of Grass, a virus infects and kills grass species including cereal crops. The targets can also be inanimate, as in the 1970 episode "The Plastic Eaters" of the television show Doomwatch where a plastic-devouring microorganism appears.

== Narrative function ==
Scenarios where biological weapons cause human extinction or threaten to do so appear on occasion, as in the 1938 short story "The Faithful" by Lester del Rey. In thriller stories, biological weapons typically function as a plot device without being unleashed; examples include Robert W. Service's 1926 novel The Master of the Microbe and Alistair MacLean's 1962 novel The Satan Bug, and the 2000 film Mission: Impossible 2. A rogue actor, such as the archetypal mad scientist, using biotechnology to create a biological weapon is a recurring motif in science fiction stories.

== See also ==
- Weapons of mass destruction in popular culture
