= The Germ Growers =

1892 novel by Irish/Australian author Robert Potter

The Germ Growers: The Strange Adventures of Robert Easterley and John Wilbraham
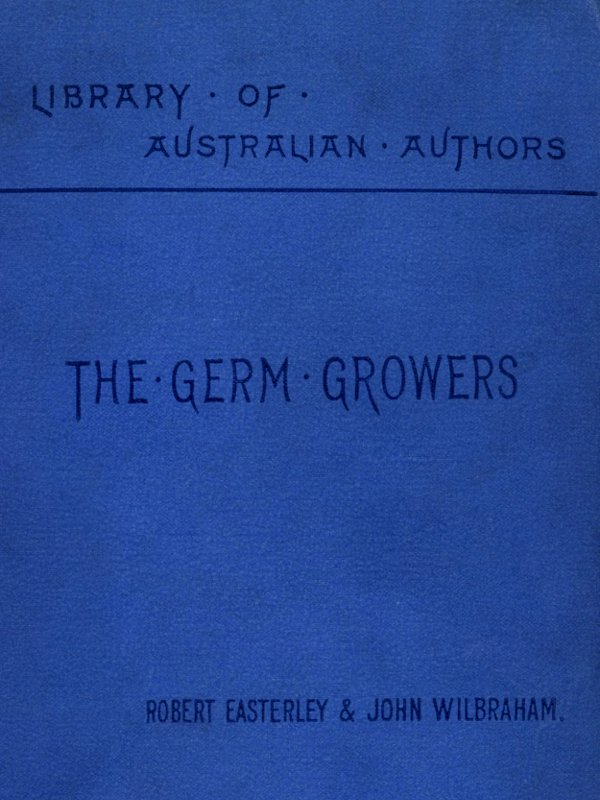
- Author: Robert Potter
- Illustrator: William Hatherell
- Language: English
- Genre: Science fiction
- Publisher: Melville, Mullen and Slade (AU) Hutchinson & Co (UK)
- Publication date: August, 1892
- Publication place: Australia
- Media type: Print
- Pages: 274
- Text: The Germ Growers: The Strange Adventures of Robert Easterley and John Wilbraham at Wikisource

The Germ Growers: The Strange Adventures of Robert Easterley and John Wilbraham is an 1892 science fiction novel by the Irish-Australian author Robert Potter.

It was originally published under the names "Robert Easterley and John Wilbraham", but these are pseudonyms of the actual author, Robert Potter.

== Summary ==
Two Welsh men, named Robert Easterley and John Wibraham, witness strangers disappearing. Not long afterwards, the surrounding area begins falling ill to a mysterious disease known as the Red Sickness. Years go by and the two go to Oxford and graduate, deciding to move to Australia and become sheep and cattle farmers.

After spending some time at their new home, they meet the natives, who they look down upon, even when they are helped by a friendly native named Gioro. They hire him as a guide. As they descend deeper into the Australian wilderness, Gioro is killed by a hostile group of natives. Robert and John soften their views towards the natives.

They soon become lost, straying deep into a remote plateau region of north-western Australia, the Kimberley. They notice shadows moving across the ground and follow the shadows into a hidden valley. Once at the valley, they discover a strange base, and are captured by the people there, who possess advanced scientific knowledge and technology such as airships with cloaking devices. They apply these cloaking capabilities by painting the surface of their aircraft. The aircraft are described as a yawl-built boat lying on the body of a large wheelbarrow. These people, led by Signor Niccolo Davell, turn out to be shape-shifting aliens, whose true appearances are seething metallic-like blobs.

These invaders' chief occupation is the creation of new diseases and enhancement of preexisting ones (such as smallpox and cholera), with which they plan to wipe out all humanity. They do this as an act of hatred towards the God of the universe, known as the Infinite One, as well killing humanity for fun.

When all hope is seemingly lost, another alien race appears, this one being benevolent, driving off all the malevolent aliens. This group of aliens is led by Leäfar — which is Rafael spelt backwards—who tells the two that his race, which are bubbly blobs that expel light, and Davelli's race have been interfering in human history for centuries.

While the two races have similar physical forms, they both originate from the ether of outer space as discarnate beings. When they come into humanity's plane of existence, they take on the forms previously mentioned.

As Leäfar's race fought and drove Davelli's race off, Robert and Jack escape in one of the alien's flying machines, only for said machine to be damaged in an air battle between the warring alien races. They slowly crashed to the earth. Eventually the two are discovered by authorities and are taken back to civilization. About a year and half later Robert and Jack both get married, with Robert marrying Bessie, and Jack marrying Violet.

== Publication history ==
The novel was printed in London and was first published in Austrailia, early August 1892, by Melville, Mullen and Slade. The exact date is unknown. On October 15th, 1892 it was published in Britain by Hutchinson & Co. The UK publication is notable because it was one of the few editions to have illustrations, specifically four drawn by W. Hatherell. Each of the four illustrations were printed on plate paper.

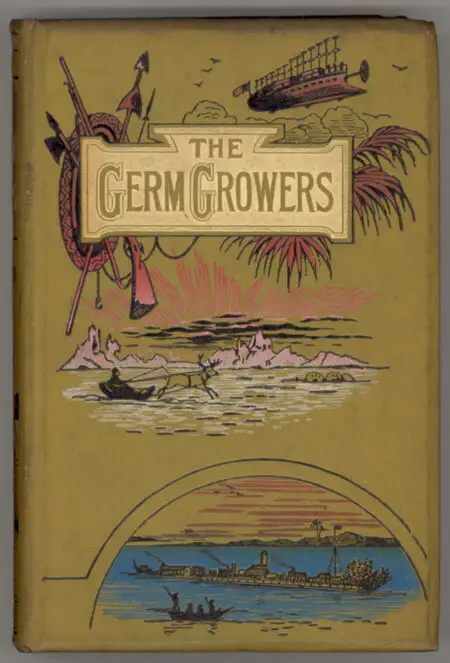
The illustrated edition: none of the four color illustrations has been scanned online yet.

More UK editions were published afterwards, including two from the The Anchor Series.

== Critical reception ==
At the time of the book's release, a reviewer made much of the book's "Christian" themes labelling this "a new version of...the fall of man, and the redemption." They concluded "that The Germ Growers is written in a clear and flowing style, and that merely as a book of adventure and incident it can be read with pleasure, even by those who may not feel much interest in the writer's theories or in the theological questions discussed in its pages."

The reviewer in Table Talk also wrote on the major religious overtones of the plot: "The motif of his book is the suggestion of a theory whereby all the evil of the world may be accounted for by the working of semi-invisible agents, who, in secluded and inaccessible portions of the globe work out their nefarious designs. Through a knowledge of hidden laws of nature these evil genii are able to disappear at will, and to render the machinery wherewith they scatter poison germs or catch up evil-minded persons suitable to act as their underlings invisible save for a mysterious shadow."

In the book, Voyages in Space: A Bibliography of Interplanetary Fiction, 1801-1914, the novel is referred to as an "Imaginative invasion of Earth".

While praised at its time, modern critics say the novel hasn't aged well in comparison to its predecessors. It has been criticized for dry writing.

The novel has been praised for pioneering the intertwinement of faith and science fiction. For as much praise as it has received for its use of these two elements, it has been equally criticized for its lack of subtlety. Australian literary critic and scholar, Peter Nicholls has said, "The element of Christian allegory (fallen angels confronted by a good angel) leaves its sf (science fiction) potential not fully realized." Many readers claim that the novel lacked the compelling combination of the two elements.

The novel shows its age in its portrayal of race, seen most prominently in its Australian native characters. With its main villain being based off Italian Catholics, it contains noticeable English centric views on Italy's contribution to politics and culture.

== Legacy ==
The novel is likely the earliest known alien invasion story, predating H.G. Wells' The War of the Worlds by 6 years. It also predates Kurd Lasswitz’s Two Planets by 5 years. But the book has largely fallen into obscurity, overshadowed by The War of the Worlds.

It is also the earliest known example of the theme of alien infiltration which was later popularized by stories such as Invasion of the Body Snatchers, as well as pioneering the trope of alien abduction.

In an ironic foreshadowing of the very story that would overshadow it completely, it’s hinted that earthly pathogens only pushed the invaders further back into space, with one of the aliens having to wear a mask, presumably to avoid becoming sick. Not long after that, one of the alien workers suddenly drops dead for unknown reasons, possibly having contracted a disease. Despite a possible weakness to earthly bacteria, Potter doesn’t take advantage of this, unlike Wells. Instead his alien invaders are defeated by benevolent aliens, rather than bacteria.

It is unknown whether H.G. Wells was inspired by this novel or not, or if he knew of its existence. In 1894, he published the short story "The Stolen Bacillus" which also deals with the topic of bioterrorism. Hutchinson & Co later worked with H.G Wells towards the end of his career, publishing his novel The Shape of Things to Come in 1933.

Another related work is the 1889 story Mr. Stranger’s Sealed Packet by Hugh MacColl, which ends with the main character marrying a Martian woman, who dies to bacteria that she has no immunity for. Aside from having a plot similar to another full on alien invasion story, its ending is very similar to The War of the Worlds. It’s possible that Wells was inspired by both MacColl’s and Potter’s work.

== See also ==
- 1892 in Australian literature
- Extraterrestrials in fiction
- Alien Invasion
- Biological warfare in popular culture
- Deus ex machina - Device to resolve the plot of a dramatic work
- Two Planets - The 2nd oldest known alien invasion story
- The War of the Worlds – The 3rd oldest known alien invasion story
