= Bellona's Husband: A Romance =

1887 novel by William James Roe

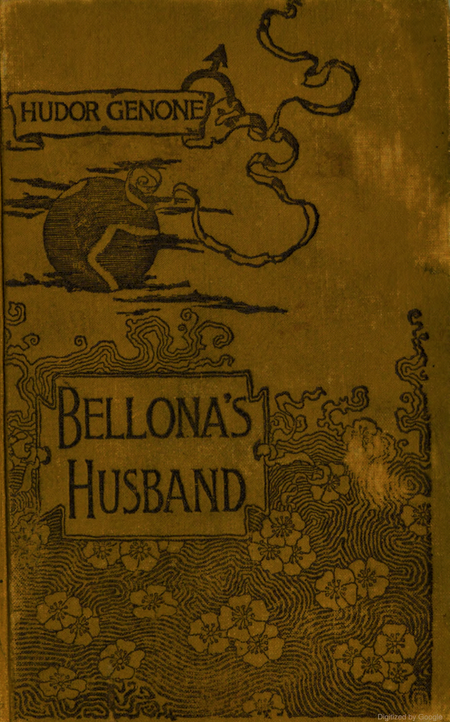
- Author: William James Roe
- Language: English
- Genre: Science fiction
- Publisher: J. B. Lippincott & Co.
- Publication date: 1887
- Publication place: United States
- Pages: 332
- OCLC: 26718713

Bellona's Husband: A Romance (Note: Occasionally incorrectly called Bellona's Bridegroom: A Romance, from a line in William Shakespeare's Macbeth.) is an 1887 science fiction novel by William James Roe, published under his pseudonym Hudor Genone. It is a tale of a utopian society on Mars where everyone ages backwards, identified by John Clute in The Encyclopedia of Science Fiction as possibly the first story to revolve around the conceit.

It received mixed reviews upon release, and later assessments have largely reiterated the main points thereof. Critics felt that it did not live up to Roe's previous novel, the 1886 satirical novel Inquirendo Island, nor to the works of satirist Jonathan Swift. Several of them nevertheless appreciated the humorous aspects, while the overall writing quality in terms if plot and pacing was generally found to be lacking. The notion of Martians speaking English was also derided as implausible.

== Synopsis ==
Protagonist Archibald Holt invests a moderate sum of money in the latest invention of Professor Garrett: a spaceship in the form of an "ethereal disc", (Note: Crossley comments that this would nowadays simply be referred to as a flying saucer.) powered by the novel material "hydrogenium" which enables anti-gravity. They take off for Mars alongside a third member of the expedition, Trip. On approach, they see that the Martian moons of Deimos and Phobos (Note: Which had at the time of the book's publication been discovered by Asaph Hall a mere ten years earlier in 1877.) are also spacecraft, albeit abandoned ones. Upon landing on Mars, they spot a naked old man wandering in the wilderness; Garrett postulates that he has been left to die as a form of Malthusian population control. Once they enter Martian society, they discover that the Martians speak English. Garrett worries that this means that Mars has been settled from Earth and that the patent for his method of space travel would thus be invalid. It turns out, however, to be a result of life developing in the same way on Mars as on Earth, and the Martians have evolved further than Earth (Note: In accordance with the contemporary version of the nebular hypothesis of Solar System formation which held that planets further from the Sun are older than those closer to the Sun.) in achieving a universal language spoken by all across the planet. The trio quickly run afoul of the Martian legal system, which is based on strict adherence to the literal truth at all times.

Holt—although he is already married on Earth—falls in love with a Martian woman, Bellona Harbinger, and the two are engaged. At this point, the Earthmen discover that the Martians age backwards—the old man they saw upon arrival was in fact being born, not dying. Bellona, though she looks to be in her twenties, is in fact eighty years old and a widow several times over. Holt is tasked with finding Bellona's uncle, who is due to be born. He finds a man who fits the description, but grows suspicious when he recognizes the man's shoes as Earth-made. The man reveals himself to be Cuban physicist Palma Zanchese, who had ventured to Mars before Garrett's expedition and been mistaken for a magical "never-aging" (i.e. never growing younger) Martian when he went for a swim, and had decided to play along. Zanchese and Holt combine the last of the hydrogenium left from their respective journeys to power a single spaceship and go back to Earth, leaving Garrett and Trip behind on Mars.

== Publication history ==
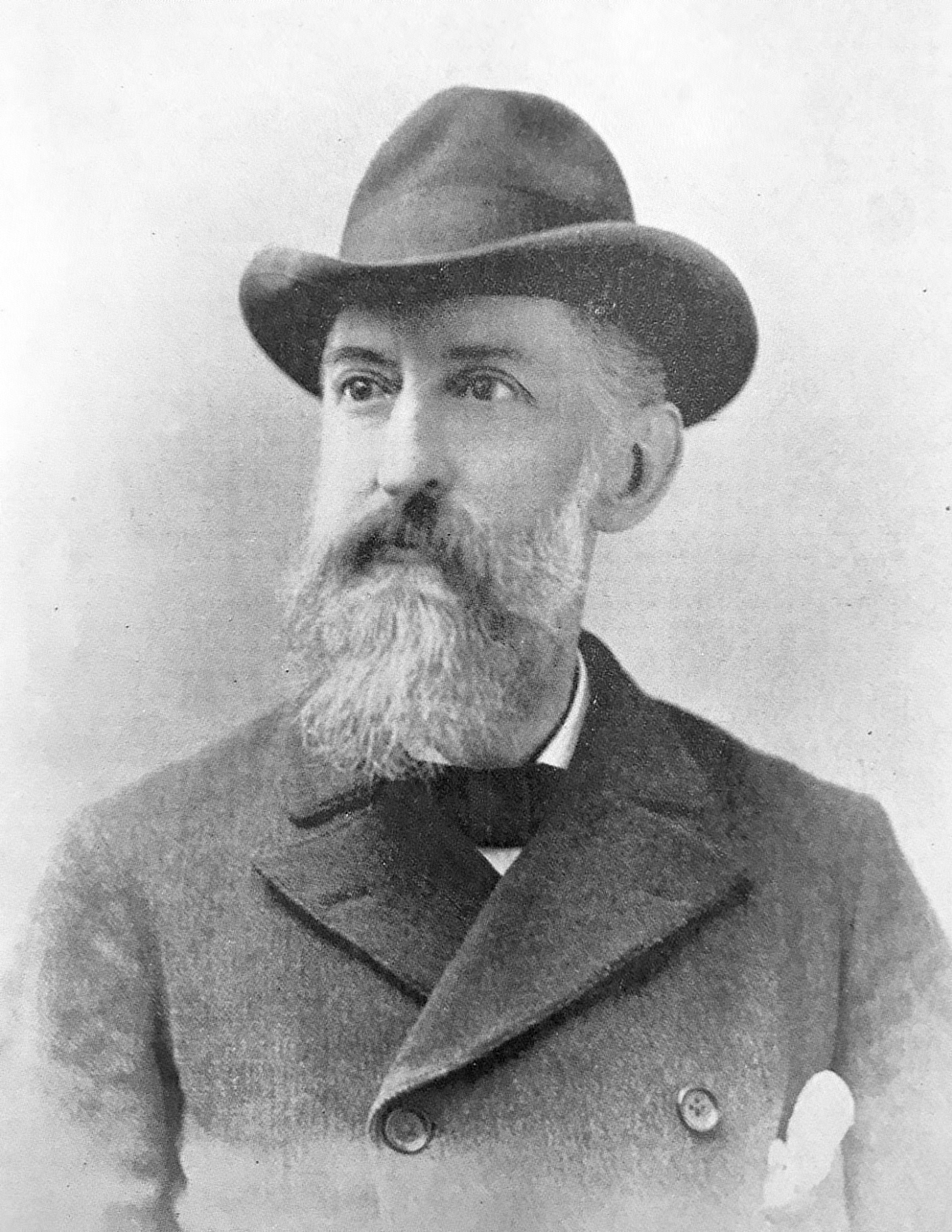
Author William James Roe

Bellona's Husband: A Romance was written by US author William James Roe (1843–1921), who wrote speculative fiction under the pseudonym Hudor Genone and conventional fiction under his own name. He also used other pseudonyms, including G. I. Cervus and Viroe. The book was published in 1887 by US publishing house J. B. Lippincott & Co. under the Genone pseudonym. Through the 20th century, it never saw a reprint.

Roe had previously written the satirical novel Inquirendo Island, which was published by G. P. Putnam's Sons in 1886, also under the Genone pseudonym. Bellona's Husband was marketed as "by Hudor Genone, author of Inquirendo Island". Roe's later novel The Last Tenet Imposed upon the Khan of Thomathoz was published in 1892 by Charles H. Kerr & Company, likewise as by Genone.

== Reception ==
=== Contemporary ===
Reviews upon initial release were mixed. An 1887 review in the New-York Tribune, reprinted by various outlets, said that while the work demonstrated a certain amount of talent in its author, the execution was "not free from the defect of clumsiness". Maurice F. Egan, in the October 1887 edition of The Catholic World, described the story as "amusing but not very carefully written". A review in the September 15, 1887 edition of New York magazine The Independent said that while the book is occasionally rather humorous—describing it as a burlesque—the author "as a satirist shows but a dull pen". The review also criticized the moral tone of the work and a perceived lack of refinement, concluding that the book is "a skit for the smoking-room rather than for the library-table".

On the negative side, a review in the July 30, 1887 edition of New York magazine The Critic said the only good aspect of the book was the concept of Martians aging backwards, finding the plot to be otherwise "coarse, disagreeable, and flat", and describing the general impression as "a long, elaborate, and exhaustive effort to be funny". The October 1887 edition of The Atlantic Monthly similarly said "Mere eccentricity is far removed from originality and this bewildering, crazy piece of fiction has not the charm of good-natured nonsense."

On the positive side, the June 25, 1887 edition of Philadelphia publication The American described the book as "deliciously absurd yet thoughtfully natural" and gave it a strong recommendation for its humorous qualities above all, while finding the pacing to be overly slow at times and recommending skipping the postface for reasons of undercutting the book's serious messages. A brief book description in the June 1887 edition of Book Chat pointed to the courtship as an interesting part of the novel. The July 2, 1887 edition of Public Opinion said that the book had serious flaws but was nevertheless an enjoyable read, and predicted that it would be "soundly berated by a few, and extravagantly applauded by thousands who will read the strange story with wonder and delight". In particular, the review commended the depiction of the Martian society as a vehicle for satire and social commentary, even if not reaching the quality of the works of Jonathan Swift or Jules Verne. The August 15, 1887 edition of The American Bookseller commended the humour of the piece and particularly the satire element, saying that those factors outweighed what deficiencies there are to be found in the storytelling, and concluding that "There is an undeniable vein of talent in the author". The Annual American Catalogue edition for 1887 described its main characteristics as "originality and a rather broad humor".

Recurring features in these reviews include commenting on the implausibility of Martians speaking English, and comparing it at least somewhat unfavourably to Roe's previous work, the 1886 novel Inquirendo Island.

=== Later ===
E. F. Bleiler, in the 1990 reference work Science-Fiction: The Early Years, commends the mystery aspect while commenting that the book lacks "the clarity of Inquirendo Island". Science fiction critic Robert Crossley, in the 2011 non-fiction book Imagining Mars: A Literary History, writes that "[o]f all the Martian books of the 1880s and 1890s, Bellona's [Husband] is closest to being pure whimsy." In Crossley's opinion, the book does not reach the satirical quality of the works of Jonathan Swift, but nevertheless serves as a forerunner for later works of satire set on Mars. Writing in The Encyclopedia of Science Fiction, John Clute comments that Bellona's Husband: A Romance "may be the earliest example of the Time in Reverse tale presented in full-fledged narrative form"; David Langford mentions a brief thought experiment in Plato's c. 360 BCE work Statesman as an earlier example of aging backwards and Enrique Gaspar's 1887 short story "El anacronópete" as an early example of certain events being seen to unfold in reverse. More generally, says Clute, "Genone's novels stand out by virtue of the intermittent but genuine pungency of their thought". Mike Ashley comments that the work is an example of the trend at the time to have Martians speaking English as a consequence of parallel evolution, and George Edgar Slusser identifies it as belonging to the tradition of utopian fiction set on Mars.

== See also ==
- Mars in fiction
- Other stories from this era set on Mars:
  - Across the Zodiac (1880), by Percy Greg
  - Mr. Stranger's Sealed Packet (1889), by Hugh MacColl
  - A Plunge into Space (1890), by Robert Cromie
  - Journey to Mars (1894), by Gustavus W. Pope
