= Weapons of mass destruction in popular culture =

Weapons of mass destruction and their related impacts have been a mainstay of popular culture since the beginning of the Cold War, as both political commentary and humorous outlet.

== Early humorous reference to WMDs ==
A 1955 episode of the radio comedy series Hancock's Half Hour, titled "The Chef That Died of Shame", contains a joke about a UN delegate wanting a chef's dumplings added to a list of "Banned Weapons of Mass Destruction".

== Nuclear weapons as a central theme in film ==
Nuclear weapons have been a central theme of film since The Day the Earth Stood Still (1951); two of the most famous are Dr. Strangelove (1964) and Fail Safe (1964). Biological weapons have also featured, as in Twelve Monkeys (1995). Several early James Bond films involve a madman, most notably Ernst Stavro Blofeld of the fictional terrorist organization S.P.E.C.T.R.E., who intends to use either nuclear or biological weapons in the quest for world domination. This has been parodied in the Austin Powers series with Dr. Evil.

== In science fiction ==
The mocking of the term "weapons of mass destruction" dates back well before the Iraq War, with Hugh Cook's 1992 fantasy novel The Witchlord and the Weaponmaster satirically mentioned that the avalanche is a terrible weapon of mass destruction, outlawed by civilised countries in the conduct of war.

The novel Dune discusses atomic weapons, and its sequel Dune Messiah employs one called a Stone Burner. In the Star Wars universe, the Death Star is a moveable, multi-use WMD capable of destroying entire planets. In the Babylon 5 universe, WMDs have been used a number of times, most directly by the Earth Alliance (the Earth-Minbari War uses nuclear weapons), the Army of Light (the Shadow War, also nuclear), the Centauri (Narn-Centauri War, planetary bombardment with asteroids by mass drivers), as well as on their own planet on the Isle of Selini to rid themselves of the Shadows (nuclear), and the Drakh (biological warfare against Earth).

In "Scorpion", a 1997 episode of Star Trek: Voyager, Kathryn Janeway describes the Borg's multikinetic neutronic mine as a weapon of mass destruction.

In many real-time strategy video games, each playable army would be able to construct a WMD or 'superweapon' to use in battle, which can be similar to WMDs found today or different from current technology.

== The invasion of Iraq in search of Sadam Hussein's alleged WMDs ==
In the context of the lead-up to the invasion of Iraq under the guise of Saddam Hussein's alleged WMDs, the phrase became ubiquitous. A parody based on Internet Explorer's "404 Not Found" message was created, poking fun at the state of international affairs, and for a time was the #1 hit for the Google search "weapons of mass destruction" but the original is no longer available in 2021. Similarly, at the annual Radio and Television Correspondents Dinner, February 24, 2004, George W. Bush joked about being unable to find WMDs in Iraq, saying "Those weapons of mass destruction must be somewhere", while showing images of himself searching the White House for something. In 2003, an EasyJet advertising campaign attracted controversy with a billboard ad featuring a woman's breasts with the phrase "discover weapons of mass distraction".

Sue Townsend continued her best-selling series of comic-political novels with the 2004 Adrian Mole and the Weapons of Mass Destruction. The eponymous hero trusts Tony Blair implicitly, and writes to him asking for proof of the WMDs' existence, so he can get a refund from the travel agency where he had deposited some money for a holiday in Cyprus, since this island is now apparently no longer safe to travel to.

In the 2004 episode of The Sopranos, titled "All Happy Families...", a parole inspector asks Feech La Mana to open his garage, where Feech has hidden contraband that, if found, could return him to prison. Feech quips, "that's where I make my weapons of mass destruction", in hopes the inspector will be dissuaded by the pop culture reference to the United States' inability to find Saddam Hussein's WMDs in Iraq.

Weapons of Mass Destruction is the title of an album released by American rapper Xzibit in 2004, who also called a car featured on Pimp My Ride a WMD. Faithless released the album No Roots in 2004 which contained the single "Mass Destruction", whose lyrics describe negative traits such as fear, racism, greed and inaction as "weapons of mass destruction".

The Doctor Who episode "World War Three" (2005) contained a double episode about an alien invasion in London. In one scene, when discussing whether or not an attack on the aliens' space craft was warranted, politicians claimed it was necessary because the aliens had "massive weapons of destruction" which could be deployed "within forty-five seconds" – a reference to Prime Minister Tony Blair's claim in the lead-up to the Iraq War that Saddam Hussein had WMDs could be deployed within 45 minutes. In The Simpsons "Treehouse of Horror XVII", aliens Kang and Kodos, spoofing the Iraq War, claim that they had to invade, as Earth was working on "Weapons of Mass Disintegration." In the episode ("Rekognize") of Da Ali G Show, Ali mistakenly refers to WMDs as "BLTs" (an acronym for the popular sandwich made of bacon, lettuce, and tomato), going so far as to ask if there was mustard gas in the BLTs.

In 2005, the Paranoia RPG published a collection of new Straight-style missions under the title "WMD". Each mission revolved around a plot device with the initials WMD. At least one of the missions involved an actual device that might have been a WMD; but, in general they simply focused on situations rife with a sense of stress, uncertainty and fear. The American TV series 24 typically features a different weapon of mass destruction in each season: the second, fourth and sixth seasons feature nuclear weapons, the third and seventh feature weaponized viruses, and the fifth, VX nerve gas, a chemical weapon of mass destruction. In the Nextwave comic book, the Beyond Corporation tests "Unusual Weapons of Mass Destruction" within the United States, starting with the alien Fin Fang Foom.

In the video game Call of Duty: Black Ops and Call of Duty: Black Ops II, there is a map named Nuketown in which a nuclear bomb goes off in the background when a round ends. Additionally, in the first game's singleplayer story, the USA is under the threat of a national attack from a German-Soviet chemical called "Nova 6", a green nerve toxin that kills nearly instantly as it is inhaled. In other singleplayer story of Call of Duty game series Call of Duty 4: Modern Warfare, there is a story where a nuclear bomb explosion in an unnamed Middle East country that killed everyone in the city, including 30,000 US soldiers.

The premise of the Metal Gear video game series involves various iterations of the titular bipedal nuclear missile launcher, presenting a constant struggle to decrease the global quantity of nuclear warheads as well as destroying the featured mech presented in its respective game.

The Big Show uses a Knockout punch called WMD.

== Biological WMDs ==
The 2008 literary thriller The Quick and The Dead by Matthew John Lee describes the aftermath of an attack on the British Isles using an enhanced smallpox virus. ISBN 978-1-906050-78-8.

== See also ==
- Nuclear weapons in popular culture
