= A Plunge into Space =

1890 novel by Robert Cromie

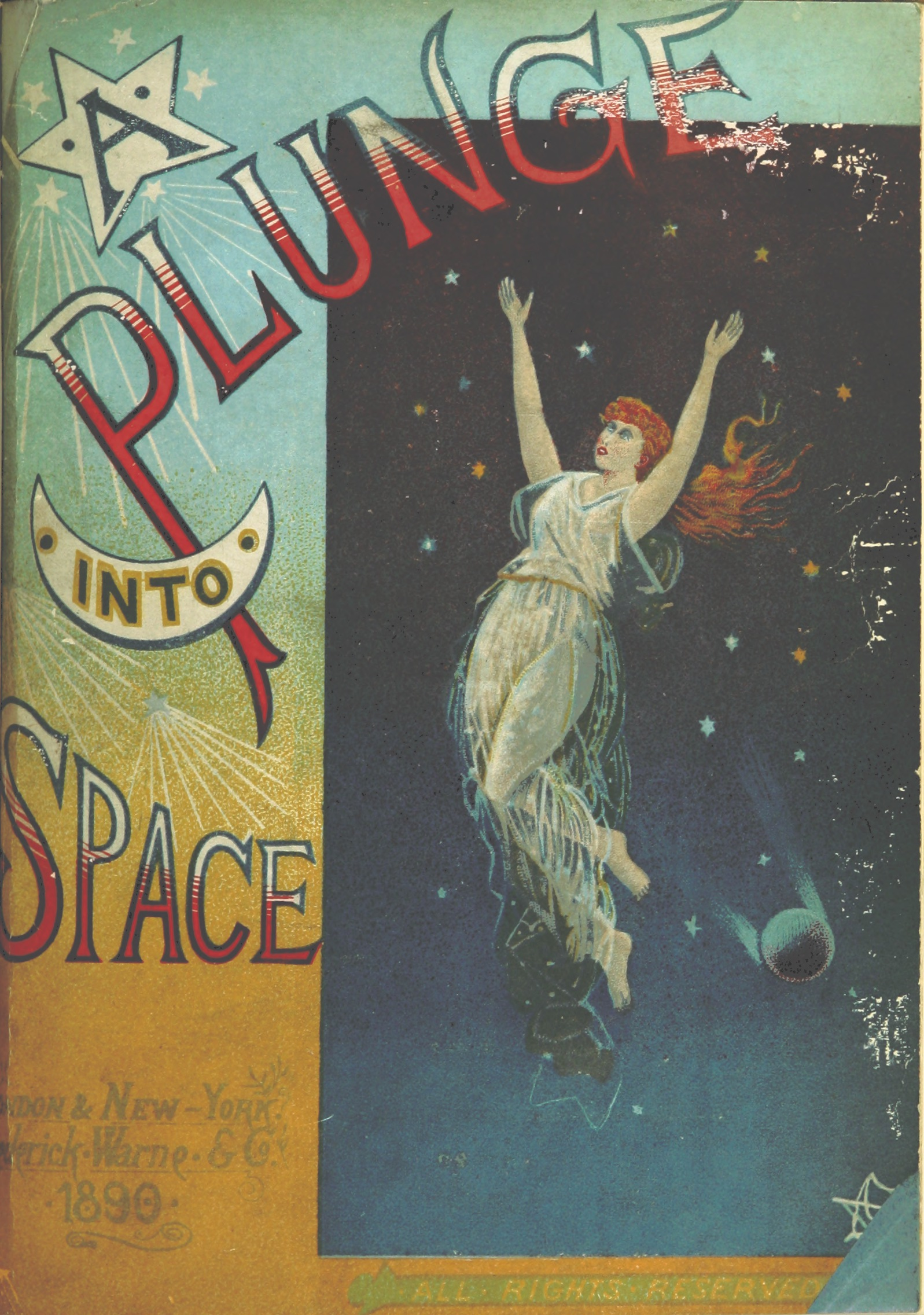
- Original book cover
- Author: Robert Cromie
- Language: English
- Genre: Science fiction
- Publisher: Frederick Warne & Co.
- Publication date: 1890
- Publication place: United Kingdom

A Plunge into Space is an 1890 science fiction novel by Irish author Robert Cromie. It describes a voyage to Mars, where Earthlings find a utopia that is so perfect as to be boring. It received mostly positive reviews upon release and likely sold well. The second edition was published in 1891 with a preface attributed to the French science fiction author Jules Verne; modern scholars have concluded that it was likely written by somebody else. Cromie later accused fellow writer H. G. Wells of plagiarising key plot elements from the book for his 1900–1901 serial The First Men in the Moon; Wells denied ever having heard of Cromie or the book.

Modern critical assessments of the book have been largely negative. Scholars have commented on its place in science fiction history, both in terms of how it relates to other works of its time and aspects that have recurred in later works by other authors. Aside from the utopian motif, imperialism has also been identified as an important theme.

== Synopsis ==
Inventor Henry Barnett has mastered the science of anti-gravity after twenty years of research. With the help of his friend, Scottish explorer Alexander MacGregor, he constructs a spacecraft in the form of a fifty-foot (15 m) metal sphere in Alaska. They assemble a team with five additional members: financier George Sterling, author Walter Durand, artist Victor Graves, Irish politician Charles Blake, and journalist Frederick Gordon. While preparing their expedition, they are attacked by Blackfeet natives; Barnett uses his new invention to dissolve their leader, whereupon the attackers retreat. The seven men then travel to Mars, the journey itself being uneventful.

Upon arrival, they find themselves in a vast desert; Barnett concludes that the purported Martian canals that astronomers had reported seeing in their telescopes are in fact simooms. They move on to a verdant region where they encounter a utopian and highly technologically advanced Martian civilization. The Martians have eradicated all disease, perfected weather control, and developed aircraft travelling at 1,000 miles per hour (1,600 km/h). Socially, they have eliminated poverty, reduced the work day to two hours, dispensed with central government and currency, and achieved gender equality. The Earthmen discover that the Martians have done away with everything that could give rise to conflict and suppressed their baser instincts in favour of intellect. The humans find this state of existence—where all possible social and scientific progress has already occurred and nothing exciting does or can happen—unbearably dull, and decide to try to improve upon it. Thus the financier Sterling and the politician Blake try to reintroduce capitalism and politics, respectively, to the Martian society. Meanwhile, the writer Durand romances a Martian woman by the name of Mignonette. The Martians come to view the humans as a corrupting influence, and insist that they leave well ahead of schedule.

On the way back to Earth, the men discover that their oxygen reserves are depleting unexpectedly rapidly. They find that Mignonette has stowed away, and as the oxygen supply is only enough for seven people, somebody has to be jettisoned into space. The men (besides Durand) agree that the stowaway Mignonette is the logical choice, but as they do not have the heart to throw her out, they decide that her paramour Durand is the next best choice. He accepts this, but is saved when Mignonette sacrifices herself in his stead. Once they arrive back on Earth, a broken-hearted Durand blows up the spaceship with himself and Barnett inside, and the secret of space travel is forever lost.

== Publication history ==
Robert Cromie (1855–1907) was an Irish journalist and author. A Plunge into Space was his second novel, following the 1889 future-war story For England's Sake. It was published in 1890 by Frederick Warne & Co. Cromie dedicated the book to French science fiction author Jules Verne.

=== Second edition and Verne preface ===
The second edition, printed in 1891, contains a preface credited to Jules Verne. There is a theory that it was actually written by somebody else, initially put forth by Robert M. Philmus and Arthur B. Evans in 1993 primarily on the basis that the book was not translated into French and Verne did not read English. Philmus and Evans also cite the lack of corroborating evidence in any bibliographical records or archives dedicated to Verne and the incongruity of Verne later criticizing elements of H. G. Wells's 1900–1901 serial The First Men in the Moon that also feature prominently in A Plunge to Space (which he supposedly praised). Proposed alternative authors include the book's publisher Frederick Warne, Cromie himself, and Verne's son Michel Verne. Stephen R. Wilk comments that Michel writing the preface "would be consistent with his greater tolerance for far-out ideas"; John Clute, writing in The Encyclopedia of Science Fiction, deems it plausible that the preface was written by somebody else; Jack Fennell finds the evidence "compelling"; and Reggie Chamberlain-King concludes that it is "much more likely" that the preface was written by Warne or Cromie than by Verne. If authentic, it would be the only preface Verne ever wrote.

=== Cancelled 1902 edition and conflict with Wells ===
A new edition was planned for 1902, but never went into print. In December 1901 and January 1902, Cromie wrote a series of letters to the editor to the weekly magazine The Academy, accusing fellow writer H. G. Wells of plagiarism. The Academy had just published a positive review of Wells's The First Men in the Moon, and Cromie believed that Wells had copied him in (among other things) the use of a spherical spaceship powered by antigravity. Cromie suggested that the upcoming reprint of A Plunge into Space would contain a preface sarcastically apologizing for "plagiarising" Wells's later work; Wells responded that he had never even heard of Cromie or his book. Wells's lawyers also threatened legal action against Cromie's publishers, should the preface be published. Whether due to Wells's legal threat or Cromie's deteriorating relationship with his publishers, the edition was cancelled; no new edition has appeared since, but a facsimile reprint of the 1891 edition was published in 1976 when Hyperion included it in their "Classics of Science Fiction" series.

On the merits of the dispute, David Lake comments that many of the aspects that Cromie laid claim to were not original to him but already established tropes of the genre, and concludes that it is likely that Wells was truthful in denying familiarity with A Plunge into Space. Lake also finds Wells's account to be misleading, writing that there are indeed similarities that Wells did not fully acknowledge and dismissing his explanation revolving around shared inspiration from Verne's 1870 novel Around the Moon. In Lake's estimation, the material that can be traced to Verne in either of these works is scant and the true source is Percy Greg's 1880 novel Across the Zodiac and the works it inspired in turn.

== Contemporary reception ==
=== Critical ===
The book received mostly positive reviews upon release. The August 15, 1890, issue of The Publishers' Circular recommended the book, comparing it favourably to the works of Jules Verne and Edgar Allan Poe. A review in the August 16, 1890 edition of The Athenaeum commented that the story was "charming", pointing especially to the reactions of the travellers to the unfamiliar elements of the Martian society. The September 1890 issue of The Review of Reviews called the book "unquestionably interesting" and "in no small degree thrilling". A review printed in the September 25, 1890 edition of the British magazine Truth described the book as "extremely interesting and suggestive". The October 4, 1890 number of The Athenaeum reprinted various reviews from other outlets. Of these, a review from Court Journal praised the humorous elements, a review from Lady's Pictorial commended the balance struck between "human interest" and the fantastical, and a review from The Scotsman compared it favourably to other then-recent books set on Mars.

On the mixed side, Tudor Jenks wrote in the December 1891 issue of The Book Buyer that the book would appeal to "young Edisons", while commenting that it does not live up to the standards set by Verne. In Jenks's view, the principal failings of the book are an overambitious breadth of topics to tackle and an unsatisfying climax.

On the negative side, a review in the September 13, 1890, number of The Academy said that the book had great potential but poor execution, with the writing quality fluctuating considerably throughout. The reviewer highlighted the character writing in particular as lacking, commenting that everyone but Mignonette seemed lifeless, and compared the book unfavourably to the works of Jules Verne and Edward Bellamy.

Several reviewers commented on apparent inspiration drawn from the works of Jules Verne.

=== Commercial ===
Sam Moskowitz writes that presence of several large illustrations in the second edition likely means the book sold well. At the time, it was common to make updated and more lavish editions of successful books to try to capitalize on the apparent high demand.

== Later appraisal ==
=== Literary merit ===
Modern critical assessments of the book have been largely negative. Roger Lancelyn Green, in the 1958 book Into Other Worlds: Space-flight in Fiction, from Lucian to Lewis, writes that the earlier parts of the book show great promise, but that it then "quickly degenerates into cheap sensationalism". Green also comments that Cromie lacks the imagination necessary to make the utopia seem realistic, comparing the book unfavourably to Percy Greg's 1880 novel Across the Zodiac. Richard A. Lupoff mentions the book briefly in a 1965 book on US writer Edgar Rice Burroughs (1875–1950), commenting that it is "generally a poor book". Brian Stableford opines in the 1985 book Scientific Romance in Britain, 1890–1950 that the plot "is bound to seem weak to modern readers". E. F. Bleiler, in the 1990 reference work Science-Fiction: The Early Years, comments on what he perceives as a peculiar mix of hard science fiction, satire, and fairy tale elements, among others, concluding that the book was likely intended for a young audience. Bleiler summarizes his assessment of the book as "A few good touches, but by and large only of historical interest". In The Encyclopedia of Science Fiction, John Clute opines that Cromie generally lacked proficiency in storytelling.

=== Place in science fiction history ===
Darko Suvin finds the book to inhabit a "historically interesting halfway position" between Jules Verne and H. G. Wells. John Wilson Foster comments that "in fictional method Cromie resembles Jules Verne [...] rather more than he does Wells". Foster nevertheless identifies several similarities in Wells's 1895 novel The Time Machine, and to a lesser extent his 1898 novel The War of the Worlds, that in Foster's opinion suggest that Wells may have read A Plunge into Space. In particular, Foster finds Wells's Eloi to closely resemble Cromie's Martians in many ways, something also noted by Robert Crossley in the 2011 non-fiction book Imagining Mars: A Literary History. Karl Siegfried Guthke, like David Lake, points to Greg's Across the Zodiac as the most direct source of inspiration for Cromie. Crossley writes that the comments made in the book about the purported Martian canals are an unusually early example thereof, and notes that the story involves the largest fictional interplanetary crew up to that point at seven people. Chamberlain-King comments on the prescience of Cromie's visions of technological developments, writing that such prescience reappears in other of his works.

In the February 1960 issue of Fantastic Universe, Sam Moskowitz writes that the book displays "many aspects of high originality". In particular, Moskowitz identifies three features of the work that would later be reused by other writers to great effect: the spherical spaceship, the desolate environment of Mars, and the climax. Spherical spaceships gained popularity following the release of E. E. Smith's 1928 serial The Skylark of Space. The Martian environment being portrayed as desolate and hostile to human life, writes Moskowitz, was viewed as a breath of fresh air when Laurence Manning used it in his 1932–1933 serial The Wreck of the Asteroid; similarly, Crossley comments that Cromie's vivid description of the Martian desolation would go unrivalled until Kim Stanley Robinson's 1992–1996 Mars trilogy. On the climax, Moskowitz writes that it prefigures Tom Godwin's 1954 short story "The Cold Equations"; others who have drawn the same parallel include Lupoff and Clute.

=== Themes ===
==== Utopia ====
Mars was commonly used as the setting for works of utopian fiction when Cromie wrote A Plunge into Space. Crossley comments that Cromie's utopia is defined to an unusual degree by the things that are absent, while Green finds the description of the Martians given by Barnett in the story—"They are at the pinnacle of their perfection. Before them is no further progress. Their only change must be towards decay."—to ring true. Crossley continues by saying that, "clearly, Cromie intended that the reader weigh the achievements against the losses and ask whether insipidity is an acceptable price for progress". Stableford writes that the device of having the characters reject the utopian society is an uncommon one in the genre, noting that the author appears to take the position that they are wrong to do so.

James H. Murphy identifies Cromie as writing in the tradition of using the fictional society to satirize his own. On the subject, Foster comments that "All the social problems that beset Cromie's Britain and Ireland have been solved on Mars—the Woman Question, the Race Question, the Nationalism Question, the Empire Question." Foster and Chamberlain-King both highlight Mignonette surmising that Ireland must be a powerful and important country on the basis that it is mentioned so much in the travellers' newspapers (at the time, there was significant political unrest related to the Irish Home Rule movement). Chamberlain-King also comments that Cromie's idea of what a utopian version of gender equality would look like is not particularly forward-thinking by modern standards.

==== Imperialism ====
The Martian facsimile of the British Empire has flourished because it did not restrain itself, as Cromie implies the British Empire has, from doing what needs to be done: the Martians won their utopia because they simply annihilated the peoples that would not submit.

— Jack Fennell, Irish Science Fiction (2014)

Several authors have commented on imperialist overtones. Murphy describes the mission to Mars as "almost shockingly linked with imperialistic and capitalistic designs", using the high-tech killing of the indigenous leader in Alaska as an example. Fennell, while dismissing this episode as any kind of direct allegory, comments that Cromie viewed himself as a subject of the British Empire first and foremost, and that this shines through in his writing; Chamberlain-King says that an imperialist attitude is apparent in several of Cromie's works. Fennell uses as his principal example the Martian society's backstory: it is mentioned in the text that it emerged from a polity whose geographical location on Mars corresponds to that of Britain on Earth, and which conquered the other regions of the planet by military might. Fennell argues that the main thing setting this Martian Empire apart from the British one, in Cromie's description, is an unflinching willingness to commit genocide upon genocide until all who would oppose it have been exterminated.

== See also ==
- Mars in fiction
- Other stories from this era set on Mars:
  - Bellona's Husband: A Romance (1887), by William James Roe
  - Mr. Stranger's Sealed Packet (1889), by Hugh MacColl
  - Journey to Mars (1894), by Gustavus W. Pope
