= Robert Potter (author) =

Irish Australian theologian and writer (1831–1908)

The Reverend Canon Robert Potter
- Potter in 1871
- Born: Robert Potter; 18 October 1831; Louisburgh, Ireland
- Died: 12 July 1908 (aged 76); South Yarra, Australia
- Occupations: Author; minister; theologian; teacher
- Spouse: Rebecca Potter (m. 1859; died 1899)
- Children: 5
- Writing career
- Years active: 1864–1905
- Genres: Science fiction; theology; philosophy
- Notable works: A Voice in the Church from Australia (1864); The Relation of Ethics to Religion (1888); The Germ Growers (1892)

Robert Potter (18 October 1831 – 12 July 1908), also known as Canon Potter, was an Irish Australian author, Anglican minister and theologian. He is known best for his 1892 novel The Germ Growers, which is the oldest known Alien Invasion story.

== Life ==
Potter was born on 18 October 1831 in Louisburgh in County Mayo, Ireland. His father was a clergyman. He was educated at Trinity College, Dublin. While there he was awarded first prize in rhetoric and English literature. Potter's college years ended in 1856 when he graduated with an arts degree, with a first in divinity.

In 1858 he relocated to Australia where his brother had already settled. On 25 April 1858, Potter was ordained deacon in Sydney, and a priest in Geelong the next year. He went to serve in Albury, New South Wales until 1854. He then went to Maldon for a brief time before being appointed to St. Mary's in North Melbourne, where he served until 1882. In 1880, Potter was appointed by Bishop Moorhouse to be a lecturer in theology to candidates in the ministry. During 1882, he began his lectures which he continued doing until April, 1905. In 1893, Potter was inducted as incumbent of All Saints', East St. Kilda, from which he retired from active service but continued lecturing.

Potter wrote and published many sermons, including The Relation of Ethics to Religion in 1888.

In 1871, he was featured in the book The Critic in Church possibly by Howard Willough. Otherwise know as Melbourne Preachers and Preaching in the form of a sketch above page 55 ,along with other priest in the area.

== Personal life ==
Potter married Rebecca, daughter of Thomas Cochrane of Ballinasloe, County Galway, Ireland, at Christ Church, Ballarat, in April 1859.

The two had five children: three sons and two daughters.

She died at her home at St Kilda's vicarage, Victoria, on 14 February 1899.

Potter often debated about Irish independence and as well as how Ireland should be ruled.

Unlike many Christians at the time. Potter accepted the theory of evolution.

Potter died 12 July 1908 at his home in South Yarra, Victoria.

Not much is known about his family, the aforementioned father and his brother's names are unknown as well as his mother's.

== See also ==
- Extraterrestrials in fiction
- Alien invasion
- Biological warfare in popular culture
