= The First Men in the Moon =

1901 novel by H. G. Wells

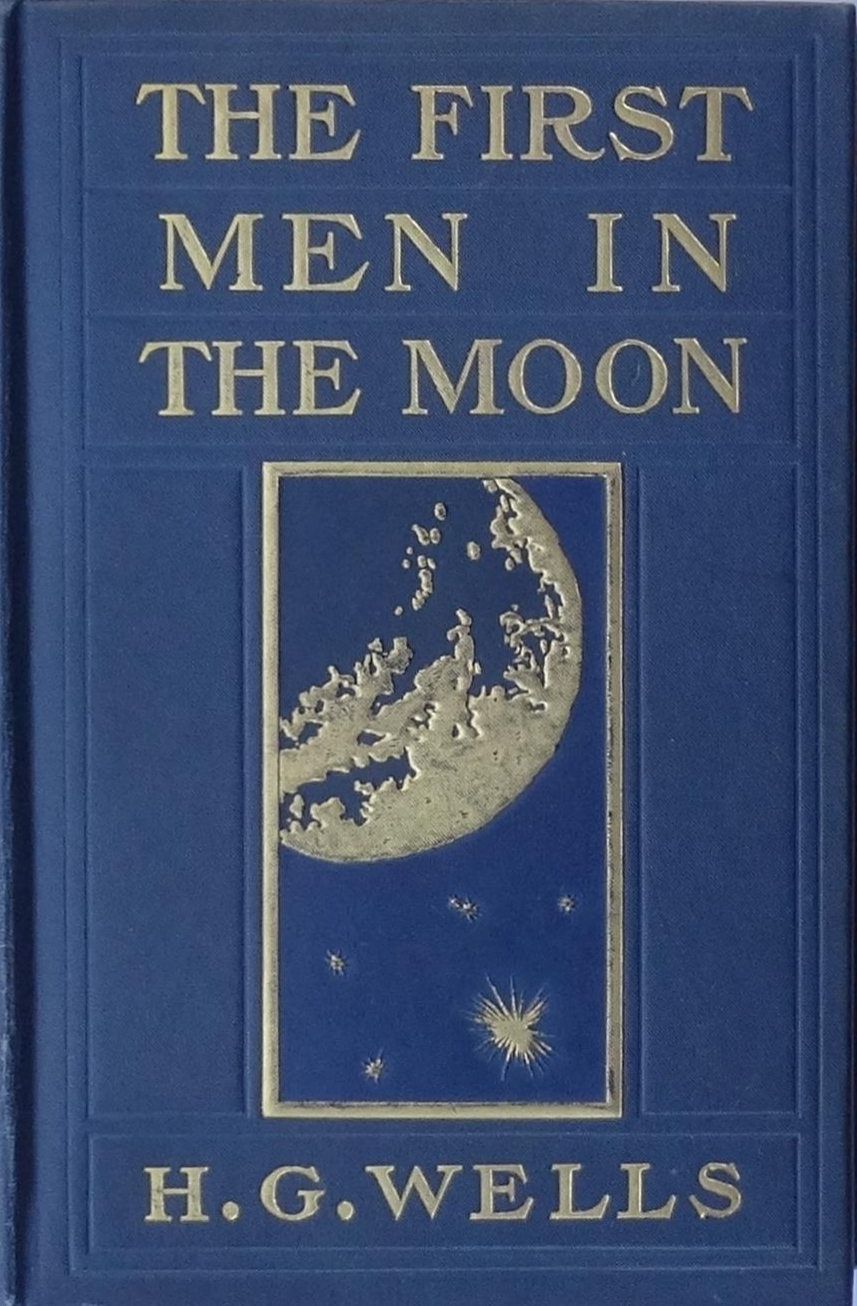
- First US edition
- Author: H. G. Wells
- Language: English
- Genre: Science fiction, Scientific romance
- Published: October 5th, 1901
- Publisher: George Newnes (UK); Bowen-Merrill (US)
- Publication place: United Kingdom
- Media type: Print (hardcover)
- Pages: 342
- OCLC: 655463
- Text: The First Men in the Moon at Wikisource

The First Men in the Moon by the English author H. G. Wells is a science fiction novel about a journey to the Moon by two Englishmen who discover that a sophisticated extraterrestrial civilisation of insect-like creatures ("Selenites") inhabits the lunar interior. The first-person narrator Mr. Bedford, a businessman, recounts his adventure with an eccentric scientist (Mr. Cavor), who has invented a gravity-blocking substance (cavorite) that the pair then use to construct a spherical spacecraft to reach the Moon, hoping to find valuable minerals. The work was originally serialised in The Strand Magazine (UK) and The Cosmopolitan (USA) from November 1900 to June 1901 and was published in hardcover book form in 1901. Wells called it one of his "fantastic stories".

The novel is a major work in the long history of the Moon in science fiction, which dates back to classical antiquity and includes earlier encounters with lunar beings and civilisations, often satirical in nature. The scientific inspiration in large part would come from Jules Verne and his book From the Earth to the Moon in 1865, which used a cannon shot to launch a spacecraft with a human crew, and the sequel Around the Moon in 1869 about the lunar journey and return to Earth—both works use the word "Selenites" to describe possible inhabitants of the Moon.

Underlying its scientific fantasy elements, the novel presents a dystopian satirical vision of an extremely regimented, intricately planned hierarchical society among the Selenites, divided into specialised roles in which individuals have strictly limited and predetermined lives for the good of the system. In the preface to the 1933 UK collected volume The Scientific Romances of H.G. Wells (published in different form as Seven Famous Novels in the US in 1934), Wells explained: "In The First Men in the Moon I tried an improvement on Jules Verne's shot, in order to look at mankind from a distance and burlesque the effects of specialisation". Comparable to Aldous Huxley's Brave New World, the book appears to be an introspective reductio of Wells' own eugenic and especially socialist ideals in favor of more nuanced versions.

The First Men in the Moon has been critically praised for its combination of action and adventure with social satire and criticism, enhanced by fully developed characters in Bedford and Cavor, elements of humor, and its vivid descriptions of unearthly places and alien beings.

== Plot summary ==
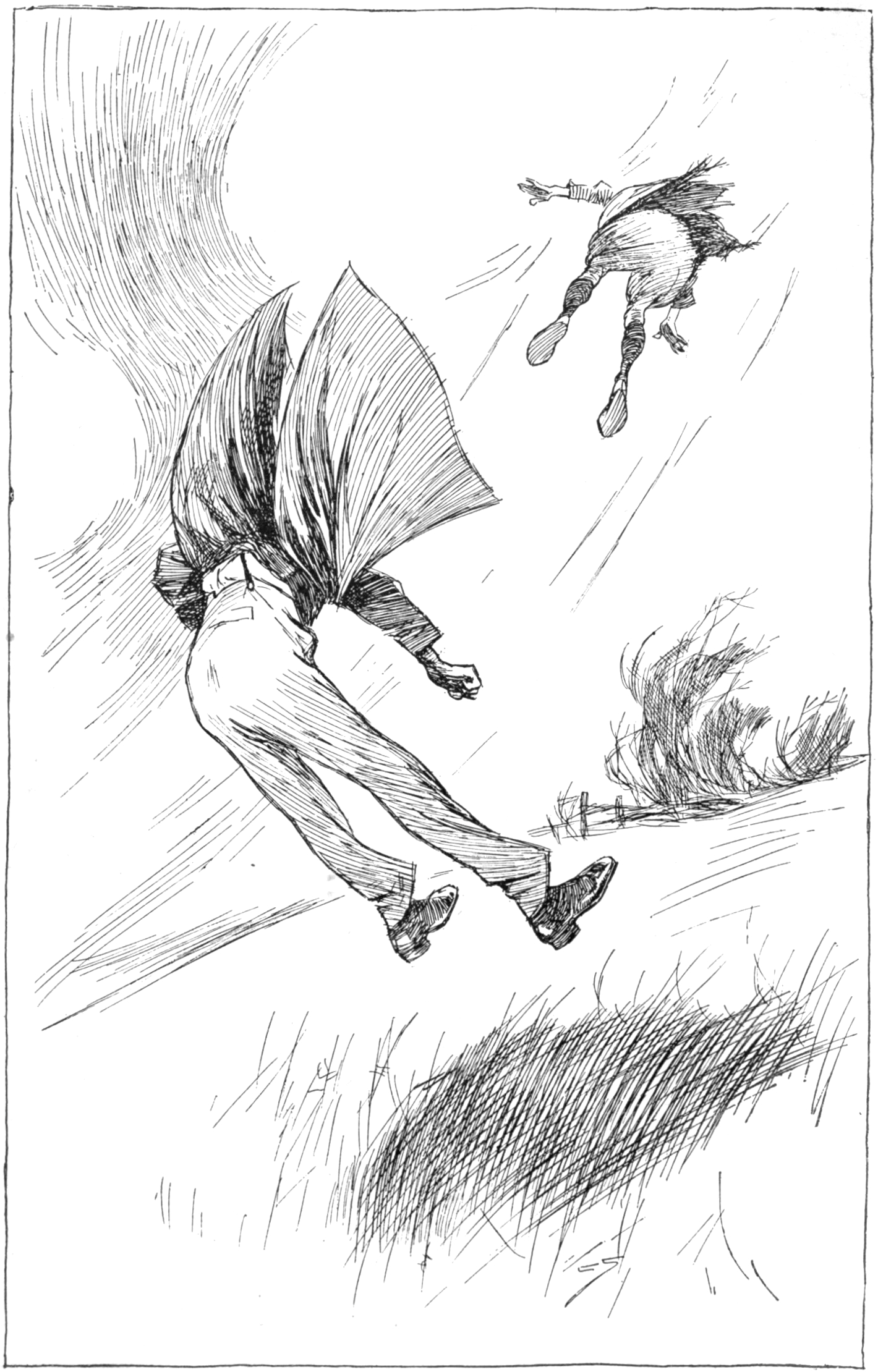
Frontispiece illustration Caption: "I was progressing in great leaps and bounds". (Bedford and Cavor are caught in a violent windstorm caused by cavorite.)

The narrator is a London businessman named Bedford who withdraws to the countryside to write a play, by which he hopes to alleviate his financial problems. Bedford rents a small countryside house in Lympne, in Kent, where he wants to work in peace. He is bothered every afternoon, however, at precisely the same time, by a passer-by making odd noises. After two weeks Bedford accosts the man, who proves to be a reclusive physicist named Mr. Cavor. Bedford befriends Cavor when he learns he is developing a new material, cavorite, which can negate the force of gravity. Bedford sees in the commercial production of cavorite a possible source of "wealth enough to work any sort of social revolution we fancied; we might own and order the whole world".

When a sheet of cavorite is prematurely processed, it makes the air above it weightless then shoots off into space, causing a violent, destructive windstorm in the local area. Bedford speculates that had the sheet of cavorite remained in place, the entire atmosphere of Earth could have been sucked up like a fountain and stripped from the planet, killing all life. Cavor hits upon the idea of a spherical spaceship made of "steel, lined with glass", and with sliding "windows or blinds" made of cavorite by which it can be steered, and persuades Bedford to help in the construction. Cavor suggests prospecting for valuable minerals on the Moon. Bedford sees an opportunity for huge wealth in developing a space travel business with cavorite-propelled spheres and liners, along with creating a monopoly on the mineral wealth of other planets. After reluctance with last minute doubts, he agrees to accompany Cavor on his voyage to the Moon. They pack oxygen and other supplies. On the way to the Moon, they experience weightlessness, which Bedford finds "exceedingly restful". Cavor is certain there is no life there.

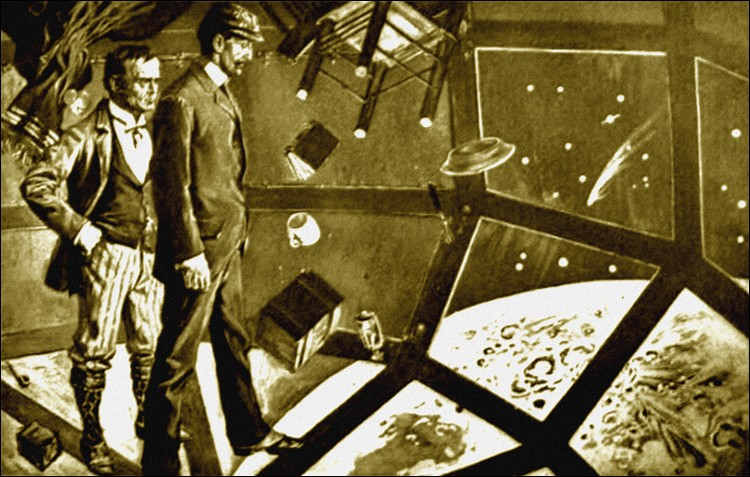
"The whole area was moon, a stupendous scimitar of white dawn with its edge hacked out by notches of darkness". First US book edition, 1901.

On the surface of the Moon the two men discover a desolate landscape, but as the Sun rises, the thin, frozen atmosphere vaporises and strange plants begin to grow with extraordinary rapidity. Bedford and Cavor leave the capsule, but in romping about in the much lower gravity get lost in the rapidly growing jungle. They hear for the first time a mysterious booming coming from beneath their feet. They encounter "great beasts", "monsters of mere fatness", that they dub "mooncalves", and five-foot-high "Selenites" tending them. At first they hide and crawl about, but growing hungry partake of some "monstrous coralline growths" of fungus that inebriate them.

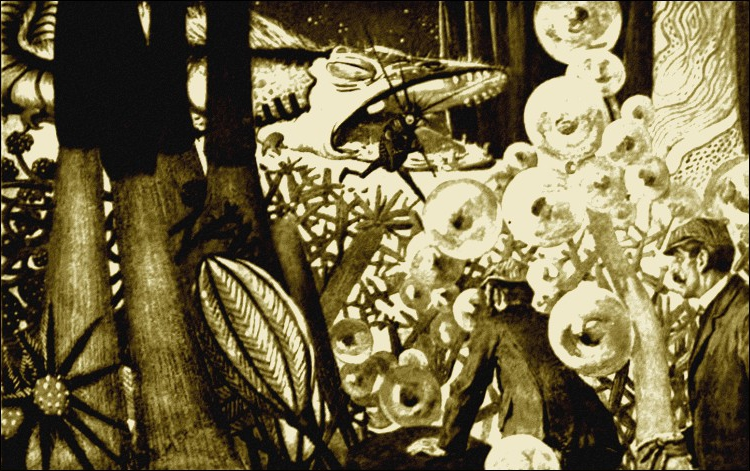
On the lunar surface, the earthmen sight a Selenite herding a huge creature: "By contrast with the mooncalves he seemed a trivial being, a mere ant, scarcely five feet high". First US book edition, 1901.

They wander drunkenly until they encounter a party of six extraterrestrials, who capture them. The insectoid lunar natives (referred to as "Selenites", after Selene, the Greek moon goddess) are part of a complex and technologically sophisticated society that lives underground, but this is revealed only in radio communications received from Cavor after Bedford's return to Earth.

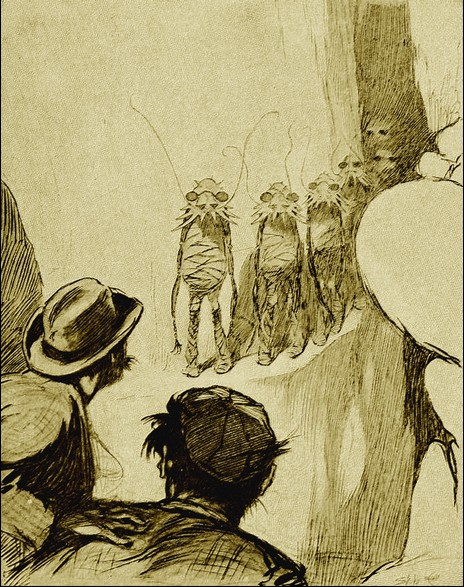
Encounter with the Selenites: "'Insects', murmured Cavor, 'insects!'" First UK book edition, 1901

Bedford and Cavor break out of captivity beneath the surface of the Moon and flee, with Bedford killing several Selenites. In their flight they discover that gold is common on the Moon. In their attempt to find their way back to the surface and to their sphere, they come upon some Selenites carving up mooncalves but Bedford fight their way past. Back on the surface, they split up to search for their spaceship. Bedford finds it just as the lunar night creeps in but returns to Earth without Cavor, who injured himself in a fall and was recaptured by the Selenites, as Bedford learns from a hastily scribbled note he left behind.

Chapter 20, "Mr. Bedford in Infinite Space", plays no role in the plot but is a remarkable set piece in which the narrator describes experiencing a quasi-mystical "pervading doubt of my own identity. . . the doubts within me could still argue: 'It is not you that is reading, it is Bedford—but you are not Bedford, you know. That's just where the mistake comes in.' 'Confound it!' I cried, 'and if I am not Bedford, what am I? But in that direction no light was forthcoming, though the strangest fancies came drifting into my brain, queer remote suspicions like shadow seen from far away... Do you know I had an idea that really I was something quite outside not only the world, but all worlds, and out of space and time, and that this poor Bedford was just a peephole through which I looked at life..."

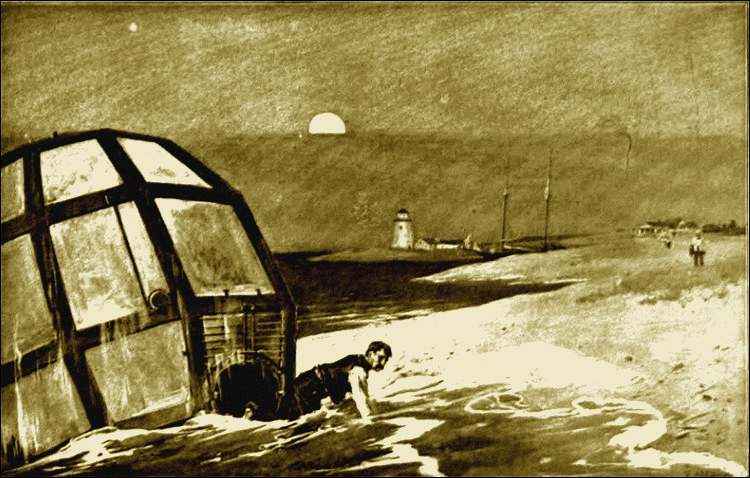
Bedford crawls out of Cavor's spherical spacecraft onto the sand after returning to Earth near the English seaside town of Littlestone. First US book edition, 1901.

By good fortune, the narrator lands in the sea off the coast of Britain, near the seaside town of Littlestone, not far from his point of departure. His fortune is made by some gold he brings back, but he loses the sphere when a curious boy named Tommy Simmons climbs into the unattended sphere and shoots off into space. Bedford writes and publishes his story in The Strand Magazine and assumes Cavor is dead. However, he is astonished nearly two years later when he learns that "Mr. Julius Wendigee, a Dutch electrician, who has been experimenting with certain apparatus akin to the apparatus used by Mr. Tesla in America", has picked up fragments of wireless telegraphy from Cavor sent from inside the Moon. The messages in the form of letter code are often broken up and incomplete but nonetheless relate detailed information. During a period of relative freedom Cavor has taught two Selenites English and learned much about lunar society.

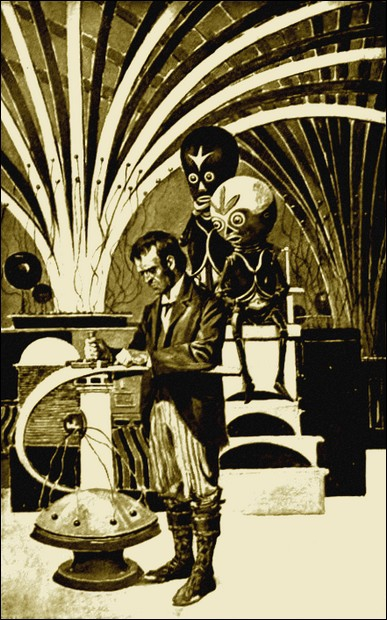
Cavor sends messages to Earth with a telegraph device he has assembled: "So far not the slightest attempt has been made to interfere with me in this..." First US book edition, 1901.

Cavor's broadcasts provide details about the structure of the Moon, which has been greatly modified by the Selenites. The round lunar surface features that earthly astronomers interpret as "craters" or as volcanoes are in fact artificial lidded openings that lead to a giant system of artificial shafts and tunnels extending deep below the exterior and that "the whole of the moon's substance for a hundred miles inward, indeed, is a mere sponge of rock" linking natural and artificial galleries and caverns. Cavor finds that the subsurface is lit by streams and cascades of water—"no doubt containing some phosphorescent organism"—that flows down toward the Lunar Central Sea, which lies nearly 200 miles below the exterior surface and which glows "like luminous blue milk that is just on the boil". The Selenites' cities lie above this Central Sea. The atmosphere circulates through the tunnels and caverns, driven by the alternate heating and cooling of the surface and the outer galleries as the Moon goes through phases of day and night.

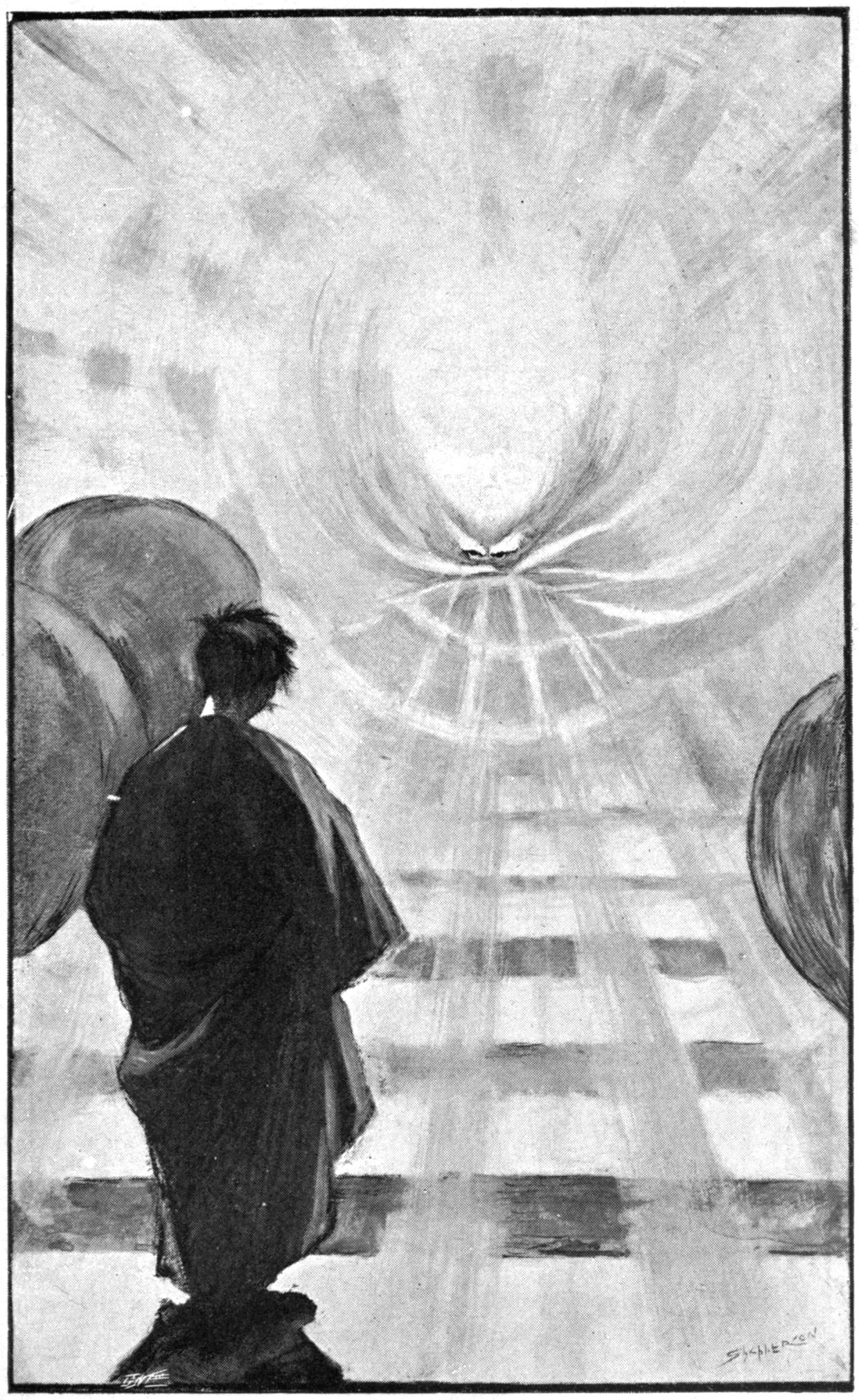
Cavor meets the Grand Lunar. First UK book edition, 1901.

Cavor's account explains that Selenites exist in hundreds of forms, many with a particular exaggerated physical feature suited to a single function, such as an enlarged arm or tentacle, or a highly developed smelling organ. Without a confining rigid bony skull, Selenite brains are able to grow continuously, and intellectual functionaries have greatly enlarged brains but reduced physical bodies. They are aided by special attendants whose only role is to support them and help them move about.

A Selenite finds fulfilment in carrying out the specific social function or task for which each has been brought up or modified. Specialisation is the essence of Selenite society: "And so it is with all sorts and conditions of Selenites—each is a perfect unit in a world machine..." Cavor learns that when members of society who perform a particular function are not needed, they are drugged and deposited on the ground in a dormant state in a huge area where giant fungus is grown for food. These superfluous members of society will be revived when it is determined that they are needed again. He reflects that: "To drug the worker one does not want and toss him aside is surely far better than to expel him from his factory to wander starving in the streets".

The single supreme ruler of Selenite society is the Grand Lunar. When Cavor finally is taken into his presence in an elaborate ritual, he finds the greatest of the Selenites seated in "a blaze of incandescent blue". The Grand Lunar's massive brain case is "many yards in diameter", with his head and body held up by servants. He interrogates Cavor about life on Earth and remarks: "With knowledge the Selenites grew and changed; mankind stored their knowledge about them and remained brutes—equipped". Unfortunately, Cavor also reveals humanity's propensity for war, causing the lunar leader and those listening to the interview to be "stricken with amazement". Cavor's next-to-last message also indicates that the Grand Lunar questioned him in detail about the creation of cavorite, an anti-gravity substance that the Selenites knew of in theory but considered impossible to make because the Moon lacks helium, a necessary ingredient.

After an ominous delay of some days, Cavor's final broken message is detected "like a cry in the night" according to Bedford, who suspects that Cavor's "disastrous want of vulgar common sense" in revealing the violent, warlike nature of human society had raised alarm among the Selenites, who feared the arrival of more earthmen. The message consisted of the broken beginnings of two sentences: "I was mad to let the Grand Lunar know..." and "Cavorite made as follows: take...", followed by the single meaningless word "uless", perhaps an attempt to spell "useless" as his fate closed in. Bedford concludes: "Whatever it was we shall never, I know, receive another message from the moon" and infers that Cavor has been prevented from further broadcasting to Earth when his transmission is cut off as he is trying to describe how to make cavorite. Bedford later dreams of Cavor "struggling in the grip of these insect Selenites, struggling ever more desperately and hopelessly as they press upon him...", and meeting an unknown fate, forced "into the dark, into that silence that has no end..."

== Publication history ==
The story was originally serialised in The Strand Magazine (UK) and The Cosmopolitan (USA) from November 1900 to June 1901 and published in hardcover that same year. The first UK book edition (1901) was published by George Newnes Ltd (publisher of The Strand Magazine) in London, with illustrations by Claude Shepperson. The first US book edition (1901) was published by the Bowen-Merrill Company in Indiana, with illustrations by Emil Hering.

== Influence on C. S. Lewis ==
C. S. Lewis explicitly stated that his science fiction books were both inspired by and written as an antithesis to those of H. G. Wells. Specifically, he acknowledged The First Men in The Moon to be "the best of the sort [of science fiction] I have read...." (from a letter to Roger Lancelyn Green).

The influence of Wells's book is especially visible in Out of the Silent Planet, the first book of Lewis's Space Trilogy. There, too, a central role in the story line is played by a partnership between a worldly businessman interested in the material gains from space travel (and specifically, in importing extraterrestrial gold to Earth) and a scientist with wider cosmic theories.

Also in Lewis's book, the two quietly build themselves a spaceship in the seclusion of an English country house, and take off into space without being noticed by the rest of the world. (It may be noted that both Wells and Lewis, like virtually all science fiction writers until the 1950s, grossly underestimated the resources needed for even the smallest jaunt outside Earth's gravitational field.) Like Wells's book, Lewis's reaches its climax with the Earth scientist speaking to the wise ruler of an alien world (in this case Oyarsa, the ruler of Malacandra/Mars) and blurting out the warlike and predatory nature of humanity.

However, in Lewis's book the businessman-scientist pair are the villains of the piece. Moreover, his scientist, Professor Weston, has a philosophy diametrically opposite to Cavor's, being an outspoken proponent of human colonisation of other planets, up to and including extermination of "primitive natives".

== Other influences, references, and adaptations ==
Brian Stableford argues this is the first alien dystopia.

- The character Jet Morgan takes a copy of the book along with him in the Journey into Space story, Journey to the Moon from 1953 and its 1958 re-recording, Operation Luna.
- Cavorite was featured as a major plot device in the 1999 first volume of The League of Extraordinary Gentlemen, and Cavor (given the first name of Selwyn) also appears in the volume and is mentioned in The League of Extraordinary Gentlemen: Black Dossier. In The League of Extraordinary Gentlemen, Volume III: Century, the Selenites are featured as enemies of the nude lunar Amazons.
- Cavorite also is used as a minor plot device in Warehouse 13, with its gravity blocking properties used by Wells to make a trap.
- Cavorite and Cavor also play a major role in the end of Scarlet Traces: The Great Game, with the Selenites also briefly depicted.
- The video game Voyage: Inspired by Jules Verne was based both on Wells's The First Men in the Moon, along with Jules Verne's From the Earth to the Moon and Around the Moon.
- Cavorite, Cavor, and the Selenites are a large factor in The Martian War, where Cavor's ship takes Wells, his wife, and T.H. Huxley first to the Moon, then to Mars. In the story, the Selenites have been enslaved by the Martians, used as food creatures and slaves to build the canals and invasion fleet.
- The events of The First Men in the Moon are used as the precursor to the player's adventure in Larry Niven and Steven Barnes' "Dream Park" series adventure novel, The Moon Maze Game, which describes a fantasy role playing game being played on (and televised from) a crater and tunnels on the Moon.
- An antigravity material called "cavorite" also appears in Vernor Vinge's novel A Deepness in the Sky.
- Cavorite again shows up (with similar properties) in the Japanese anime Princess Principal, set in an alternate history fin-de-siècle steampunk Britain.
- In the Night Terrace episode "Full Steam", cavorite is cited as the miraculous mineral capable of allowing the SSS Implausible, a steam-powered spaceship, to function as though it were an ocean-going steamship. However, Eddie Jones (having read The First Men in the Moon) sees through the deception, being the first in the ship's sixty-year service history to notice; he, Anastasia Black and Susan Denholm later learn that it is in fact another time-and-space-travelling terrace house from the same street as Anastasia's that is the source of the Implausible's power.
- In the second season of DuckTales (2017 TV series), the ordeal of Della Duck as she is stranded on the Moon bears considerable similarity to that of Cavor, in that a complex society is found on the Moon with an abundance of gold, and the main character (Della, in this case) attempts to contact Earth via radio. In this instance, however, it is the lunar society that is arguably more warlike.

=== Film adaptations ===
The First Men in the Moon has been adapted to film four times, and once prior to that as a mash-up Verne-Wells film:

- A Trip to the Moon (1902) was released one year after the publication of Wells's book. Georges Sadoul regarded the film as a combination of two Jules Verne novels (From the Earth to the Moon and Around the Moon) plus adventures on the Moon taken from Wells's book. More recent scholarship, however, suggests that A Trip to the Moon draws on a wider variety of source materials, and it is unclear to what extent its filmmaker was familiar with Wells.
- The first adaptation was made in 1919; the first film made from a science fiction novel.
- The second adaptation was made in 1964, with Lionel Jeffries as Cavor and Edward Judd as Bedford. In this version Bedford has a fiancée, played by Martha Hyer, who also travels with the two men to the moon. The explorers wear diving suits as spacesuits, which they do not do in the original novel.
- The third adaptation was broadcast on BBC Four in 2010. It was written by Mark Gatiss, who stars as Cavor, and Bedford is played by Rory Kinnear. This is the version most faithful to the novel.
- The fourth adaptation, in 3D, by David Rosler, was in production from 2009 to 2010.

=== Audio adaptation ===
A 90-minute adaptation was broadcast on BBC Radio 4 in 1981, dramatised by Terry James and with Willie Rushdon as Cavor and Hywell Bennett as Bedford. This adaptation was lost but later re-discovered by the Radio Circle and re-broadcast on BBC Radio 4 Extra in 2025 as part of a strand called "Hidden Treasures".

== Reception and criticism ==
Soon after the publication of The First Men in the Moon, Wells was accused by the Irish writer Robert Cromie of having stolen from his novel A Plunge into Space (1890), which used an antigravity device similar to that in Chrysostom Trueman's The History of a Voyage to the Moon (1864). Both novels had certain elements in common, such as a globular spaceship built in secret after inventing a way to overcome Earth's gravity. Wells simply replied: "I have never heard of Mr Cromie nor of the book he attempts to advertise by insinuations of plagiarism on my part."

Jules Verne was publicly hostile to Wells's novel, mainly due to Wells having his characters go to the Moon via a totally fictional creation of an anti-gravitational material rather than the actual use of technology.

Wendy Graham reviewed First Men in the Moon for Adventurer magazine and stated that "On one level, it is a ripping SF adventure yarn, and on another it is a story about something which every SF fan has pondered - how do we react when we make that first encounter? One of the characters in the book wants to be friends, the other is the all-action type. Decide for yourself."

== See also ==
- 1901 in science fiction
- Apergy
- Apollo 8
- Apollo 11
- Moon in science fiction
- Private spaceflight
