= Two Planets =

1897 novel by Kurd Laßwitz

- Dust cover of the first English edition
- Author: Kurd Lasswitz
- Original title: Auf zwei Planeten
- Translator: Hans H. Rudnick
- Language: German
- Genre: Science fiction
- Publisher: Felber
- Publication date: October, 1897
- Publication place: Germany
- Media type: Print (Hardcover)
- Pages: 1st edition: (Both volumes) 966.

Two Planets (German: Auf zwei Planeten, lit. On Two Planets, 1897) is an influential science fiction novel by Kurd Lasswitz, postulating intelligent life on Mars. It was first published in hardcover by Felber in two volumes in October 1897. There have been many editions since, including abridgments by the author's son Erich Lasswitz (Cassianeum, 1948) and by Burckhardt Kiegeland and Martin Molitor (Verlag Heinrich Scheffler, 1969).

The 1948 abridgement, with "incidental parts" of the text taken from the 1969 version, was the basis of the first translation into English by Hans H. Rudnick, published in hardcover by Southern Illinois University Press in 1971. A paperback edition followed from Popular Library in 1976.

The story covers topics like colonization, mutually assured destruction, and the clash of civilizations many generations before those topics came into politics.

== Summary ==
A group of German explorers go to the North Pole on a hydrogen balloon, but upon their arrival, they crash and are saved by Martians, who call themselves the Nume. After they heal, the explorers learn more about the Martians. The explorers find the Martians to be superior to man in every single way and to have even their own moral code: Numenheit. Their space stations are described as gaint rings.

The Nume are described as humanoid, with large foreheads and large eyes. While not initially interested in war, the aliens are not entirely benevolent since they are interested in exploiting Earth's resources. Over time, the Martians increasingly show interest in conflict, which stems mainly from the inferiority of humanity and its morals and from the arrogance of the Martians.

Tensions rise between Europe and the Martians and lead to a battle in which the Martians, led by a Nume named Ell, defeat a British warship. Tensions continue to rise between the two worlds and eventually lead to the fall of the British Empire and a full worldwide invasion of Earth by the Martians. The Martian occupation eventually becomes a tyranny.

As the conflict continues, a worldwide resistance forms, mainly located in America, where Martian technology is reverse-engineered, and the tables are turned. That, along with a pro-human faction on Mars, leads to a peace treaty.

== Depiction of mars ==
Lasswitz hewed closely to the description by the astronomer Giovanni Schiaparelli of the Martian channels (canali) and even closer to that of Percival Lowell, who viewed them as actual canals engineered by intelligent beings. Lasswitz's depiction is more reflective of the views of those astronomers than those of other science fiction stories of the era dealing with the planet, including H. G. Wells's The War of the Worlds, Edwin Lester Arnold's Lieut. Gullivar Jones: His Vacation and Edgar Rice Burroughs's tales of Barsoom, all of which were all written in the wake of Lasswitz's book.

== Editions ==
The first edition was 966 pages in length. It was split into two volumes upon release in October 1897. The first volume contained 421 pages and the second volume contained 545 pages. The original edition was limited to only around two thousand copies.

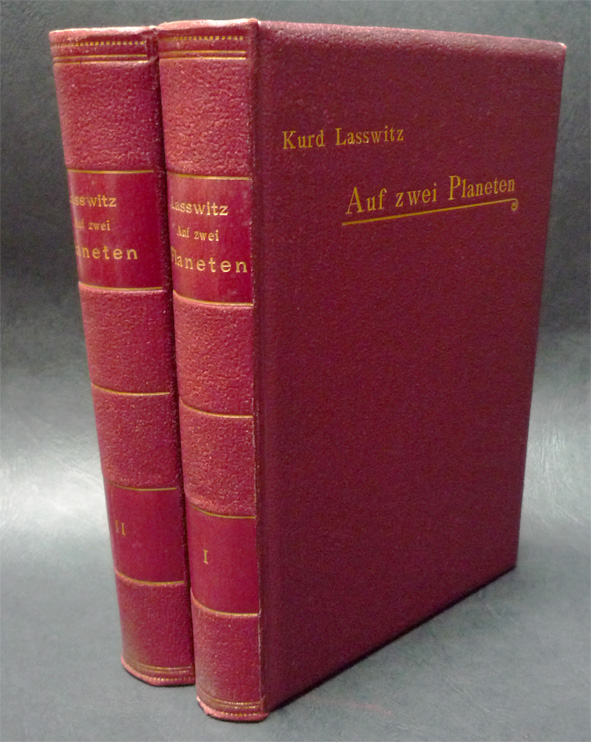
Original 1897 two volume edition.

The 1948 edition drastically cut the novel to only 326 pages and was made by the author’s son Erich Lasswitz. In the same year, illustrations of the novel were made by Walter Zeeden.

In November 1971, the most widely circulated edition was made and translated by Hans H. Rudnick. This edition is usually around 413 pages in length.

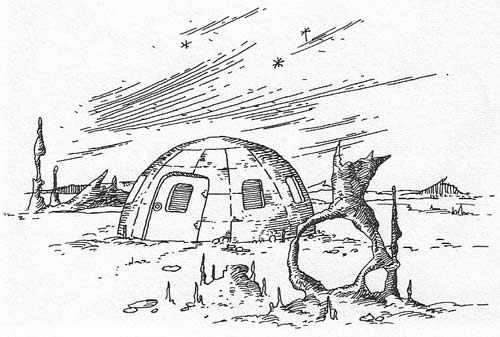
Martian Base in the North Pole.

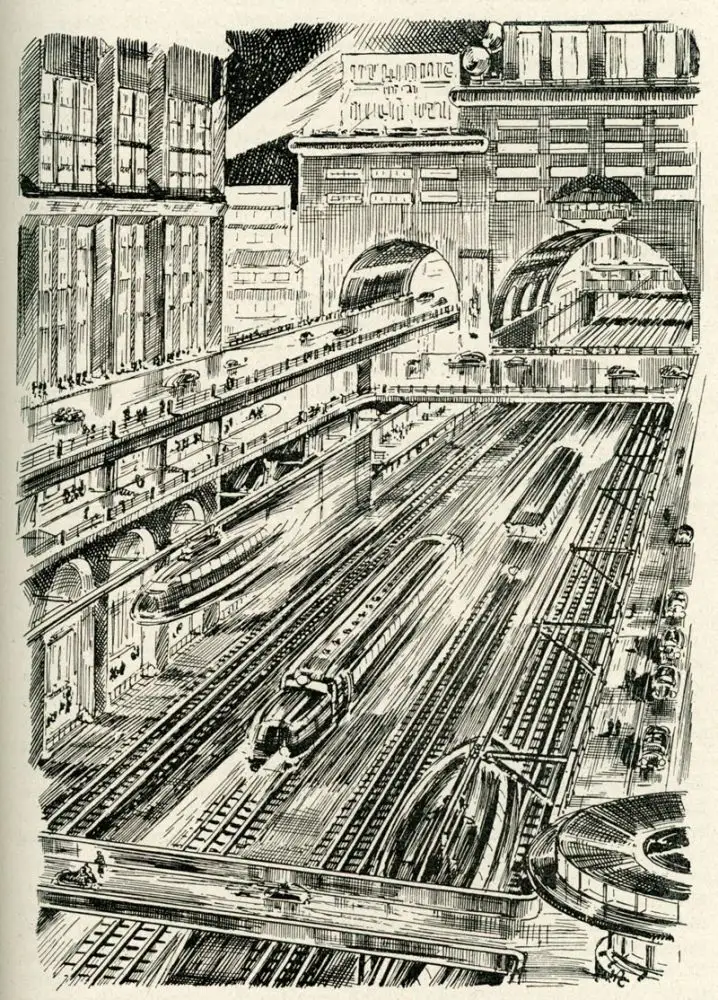
Life on Mars.

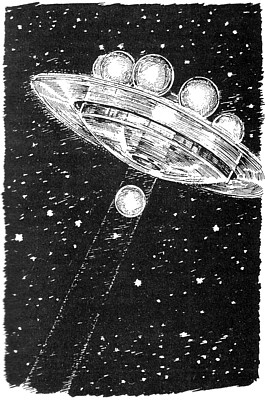
The Martian space station.

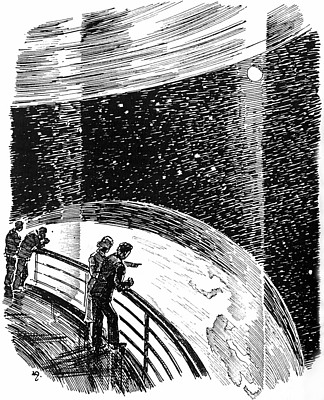
View of the Earth from the space station.

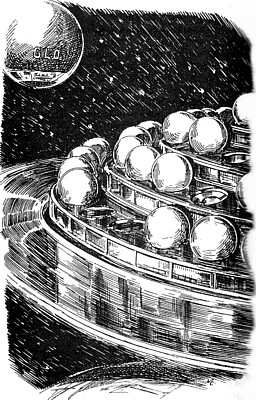
The government ship "Glo" locks at the Martian space station.

== Reception ==
Theodore Sturgeon, reviewing that 1971 translation for The New York Times, found Two Planets "curious and fascinating . . . full of quaint dialogue, heroism, decorous lovemaking, and gorgeous gadgetry." Bleiler noted that the translated text was severely abridged, losing 40% of the original text; although the quality of the translation was good, he characterized the abridgment as "a bad emasculation . . . This loss of detail results in a skeletization that omits important background and weakens motivations and plot connections.

Lester del Rey similarly dismissed the 1971 translation as a bowdlerization that is "bad scholarship, . . . unfair to readers [and] grossly unfair to Lasswitz." Del Rey noted that the translation was based on a 1948 abridgment prepared by the author's son, with other modifications made by the translator.

By 1930, the novel had sold around seventy thousand copies worldwide.

== Legacy ==
Two Planets, released in October 1897, was the second alien invasion story, after The Germ Growers (August 1892). It has been overshadowed by The War of the Worlds (January 1898), and has largely fallen into obscurity, though not as obscure as The Germ Growers. Unlike The Germ Growers, it is somewhat well known in its country of origin, especially among German scholars.

In the mid 1930’s the novel was banned by the Nazi party. And was out of print until 1948, since then in its home country the novel has been in print.

The novel is the earliest known example of the theme of a beneficial alien invasion even though unlike later examples, the invaders become more malevolent as the story progresses.

The novel was popular in Germany in its day. Wernher von Braun and Walter Hohmann were inspired by reading it as children, just as Robert H. Goddard was by reading The War of the Worlds. While there was no English translation before 1971, the American writer Everett F. Bleiler notes that it likely influenced American genre of science fiction via Hugo Gernsback: "Hugo Gernsback would have been saturated in Lasswitz's work, and Gernsback's theoretical position of technologically based liberalism and many of his little scientific crotchets resemble ideas in Lasswitz's work."

On January 1, 1929, the original version of the text fell into the public domain in America. The 1948 edition will fall into the public domain on January 1, 2044, and that of 1971 on January 1, 2067.

The original version has been in the public domain since 1982 in its country of origin.

== See also ==
- Extraterrestrials in fiction
- Alien invasion
- The Germ Growers
- The War of the Worlds
