= Kurd Lasswitz =

German author, scientist and philosopher

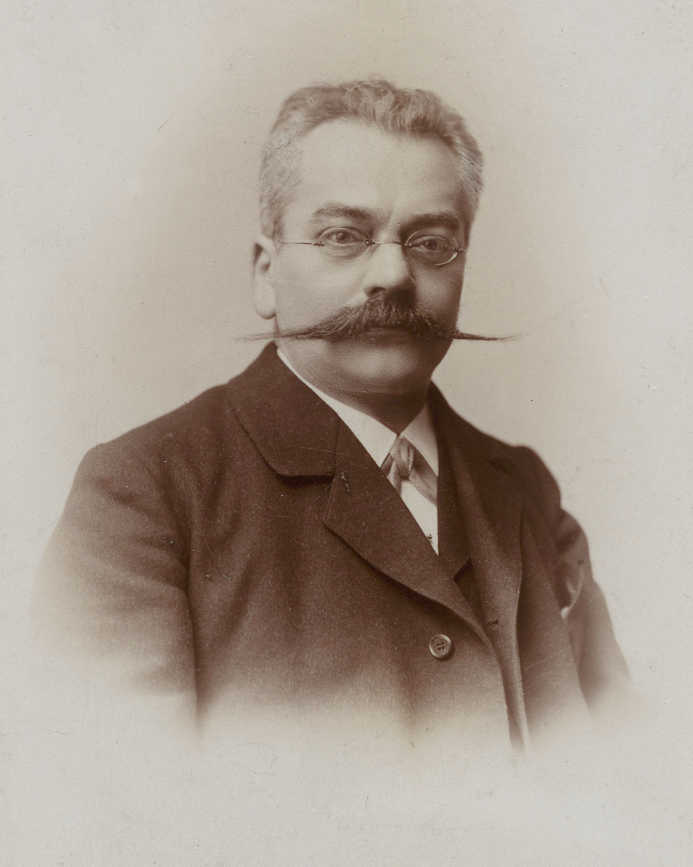
- Lasswitz in 1900
- Born: 20 April 1848; Breslau, Kingdom of Prussia, German Confederation (now Wrocław, Poland)
- Died: 17 October 1910 (aged 62); Gotha, Saxe-Coburg and Gotha, German Empire
- Occupation: Writer
- Writing career
- Notable work: Two Planets

Kurd Lasswitz (German: Kurd Laßwitz; 20 April 1848 – 17 October 1910) was a German author, scientist, and philosopher. He has been called "the father of German science fiction". He sometimes used the pseudonym Velatus.

== Biography ==
Lasswitz studied mathematics and physics at the University of Breslau and the University of Berlin, and earned his doctorate in 1873. He spent most of his career as a teacher at the Ernestine Gymnasium in Gotha (1876–1908).

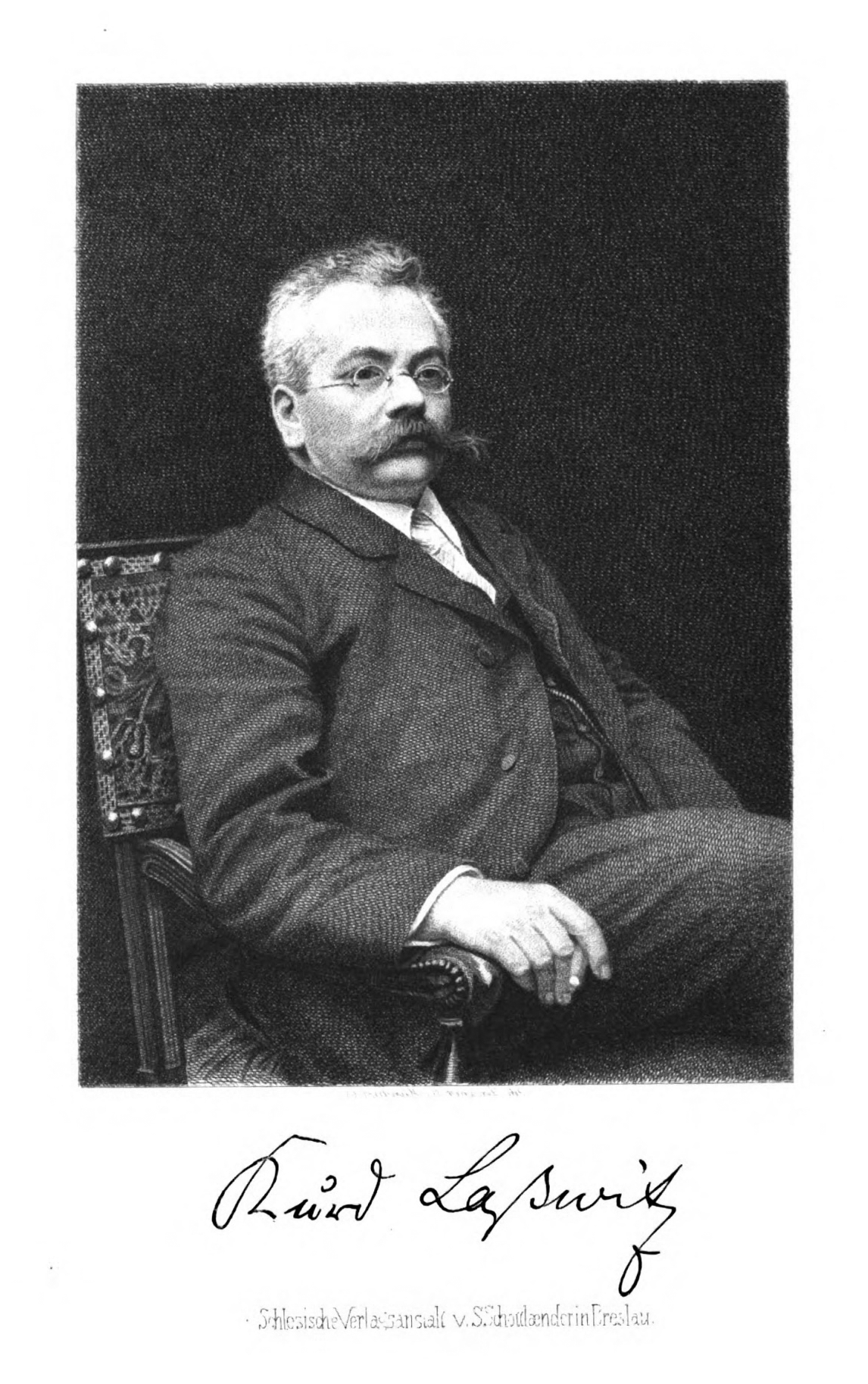
Lasswitz in 1903, including his signature.

== Works ==
His first published science fiction story was Bis zum Nullpunkt des Seins ("To the Zero Point of Existence", 1871), depicting life in 2371, but he earned his reputation with his 1897 novel Auf zwei Planeten, which describes an encounter between humans and a Martian civilization that is older and more advanced. The book has the Martian race running out of water, eating synthetic foods, travelling by rolling roads, and utilising space stations. His spaceships use anti-gravity, but travel realistic orbital trajectories, and use occasional mid-course corrections in travelling between Mars and the Earth; the book depicted the technically correct transit between the orbits of two planets, something poorly understood by other early science fiction writers. It influenced Walter Hohmann and Wernher von Braun. The book was not translated into English until 1971 (as Two Planets), and the translation is incomplete. Auf zwei Planeten was his most successful novel. A story from Lasswitz's Traumkristalle served as the basis for "The Library of Babel", a short story by Jorge Luis Borges.

His last book was Sternentau: Die Pflanze vom Neptunsmond ("Star Dew: the Plant of Neptune's Moon", 1909). He is also known for his 1896 biography of Gustav Fechner.

For his writing (totalling around 420 works including non-fiction), Lasswitz has been called "the first utopistic-scientific writer in Germany" or even "a German Jules Verne".

A crater on Mars was named in his honour, as was the asteroid 46514 Lasswitz.

There also is the Kurd-Laßwitz-Preis, an award for German-speaking as well as foreign authors of science fiction since 1981.

== See also ==
- German science fiction literature
- Extraterrestrials in fiction
- Alien Invasion
