= Robert Cromie =

Journalist and novelist from Ireland

Robert Cromie

Robert Cromie (1855–1907) was an Irish journalist and novelist. Cromie's 1895 novel The Crack of Doom was his most successful and contains the first description of an atomic explosion.

== Early life and family ==
Robert Cromie was the third son of Dr. Cromie J.P., of Clough, the local registrar of births and deaths and ruling elder of Clough Presbyterian church. Robert's elder sister, Annie Howe Cromie (1849-1939), to whom he was particularly close, was the wife of John Jordan, and named her second son after him. Through Cromie's mother, a Miss Henry of Ballyhosset (near Downpatrick), he was descended from Gilbert Howe (c.1626-c.1712), of Ballytrim (near Killyleagh), the confidential servant to James Hamilton, 1st Earl of Clanbrassil, and was thus connected by blood to many of the leading families in East Down.

Cromie was born on 17 July 1855 at Clough. He was educated at home before being sent with an older brother to the Royal Belfast Academical Institution where, according to one article, he claimed "an unbeaten record in the matter of examinations, having never once failed, by reason... of having never once entered".

== Career ==
Instead of pursuing an academic path, Cromie followed one of his brothers, Andrew Gilbert Howe Cromie (d. 1937), into the Ulster Bank and worked in various parts of Ireland including Donegal, Trim and Derry. His final posting was to the Ulster Bank's head office in Waring Street, Belfast. While working in Trim, Cromie developed a close friendship with Charles Reichel, Bishop of Meath, an association regarded as influential on the development of Cromie's style.

His first book, For England's Sake, was published in 1889.

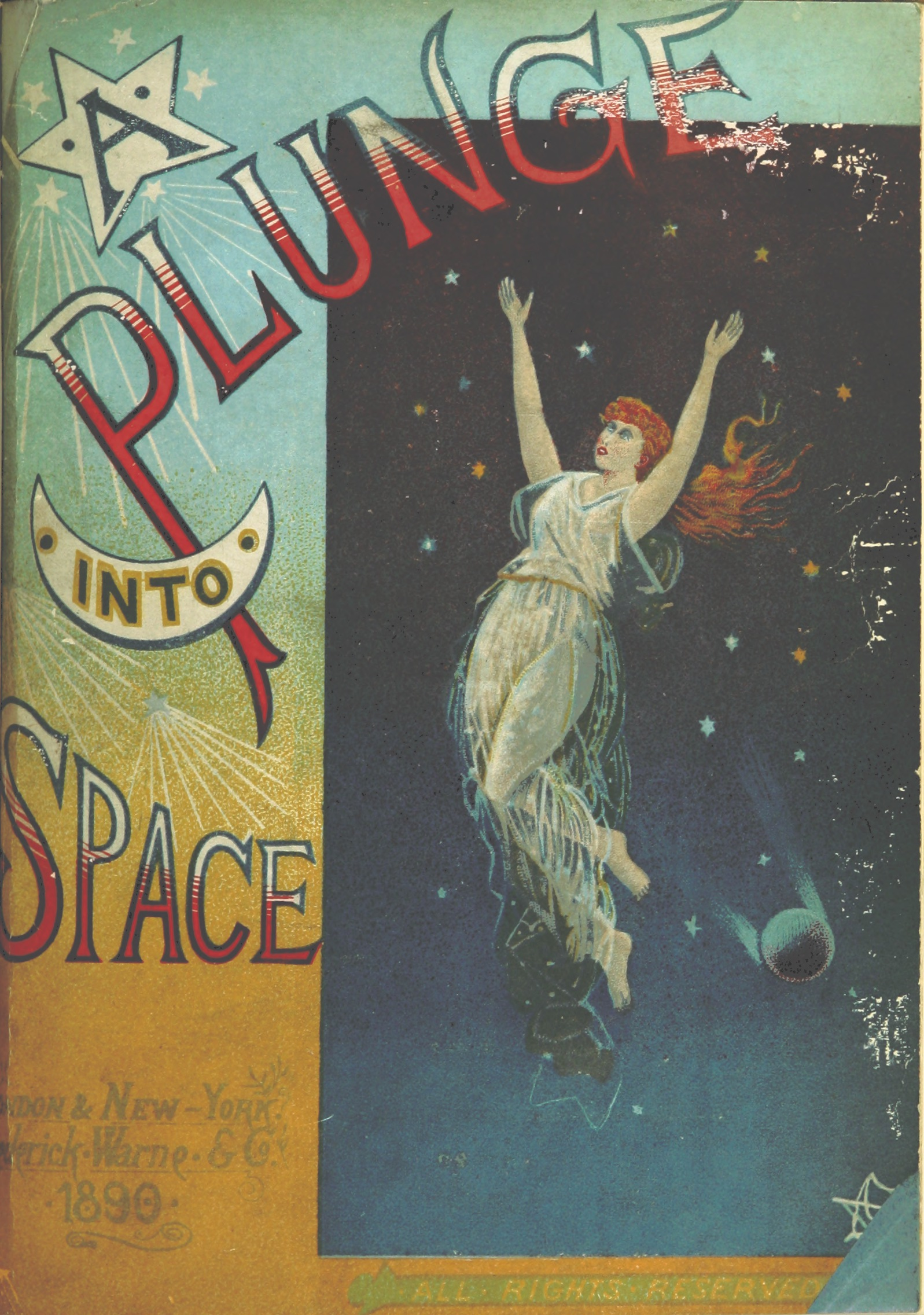
A Plunge into Space, 1890

A Plunge into Space, a science fiction novel, was published in 1890. It was well received and Jules Verne wrote a preface to the second edition in 1891. The work predates H. G. Wells's The First Men in the Moon by some 10 years, but contains a number of similarities. Cromie pointed these out in letters to the Academy journal. Cromie's 1895 novel The Crack of Doom was his most successful and contains the first description of an atomic explosion.

In the early 1880s, Cromie contributed many articles to cycling magazines, most to The Wheel World, describing bicycle tours around Ulster. Cromie's other great passion was golf. He was a member of the Ormeau Golf Club and was captain in 1898.

== Death ==
Robert Cromie died unmarried in his rooms at 95 South Parade Belfast in April 1907.

== Bibliography ==
- For England's Sake, London & New York: Frederick Warne & Co., 1889
- A Plunge into Space, London & New York: Frederick Warne & Co, 1890
- The Crack of Doom, London: Digby, Long & Co, 1895; London: George Newnes, 1896.
- The Next Crusade, London: Hutchinson & Co, 1896
- The King's Oak, and Other Stories, London: R. Aickin & Co; Belfast: Geo. Newnes, 1897
- The Lost Liner, London: R. Aickin & Co; Belfast: Geo. Newnes, 1898
- Through Southern Norway, Belfast: R. Aickin & Co. Ltd., 1898
- Kitty's Victoria Cross, London & New York: Frederick Warne & Co, 1901
- A New Messiah: A Novel, London: Digby, Long & Co, 1901
- The Shadow of the Cross, London: Ward, Lock & Co, 1902
- The Romance of Poisons: being weird episodes from life, London: Jarrold & Sons, 1903. (co-authored with T. S. Wilson)
- El Dorado, London: Ward, Lock & Co, 1904
- Told in the Twilight, Dublin: Sealy, Bryers & Walker, 1907[?]
