= Alien invasion =

Common theme in science fiction stories and film

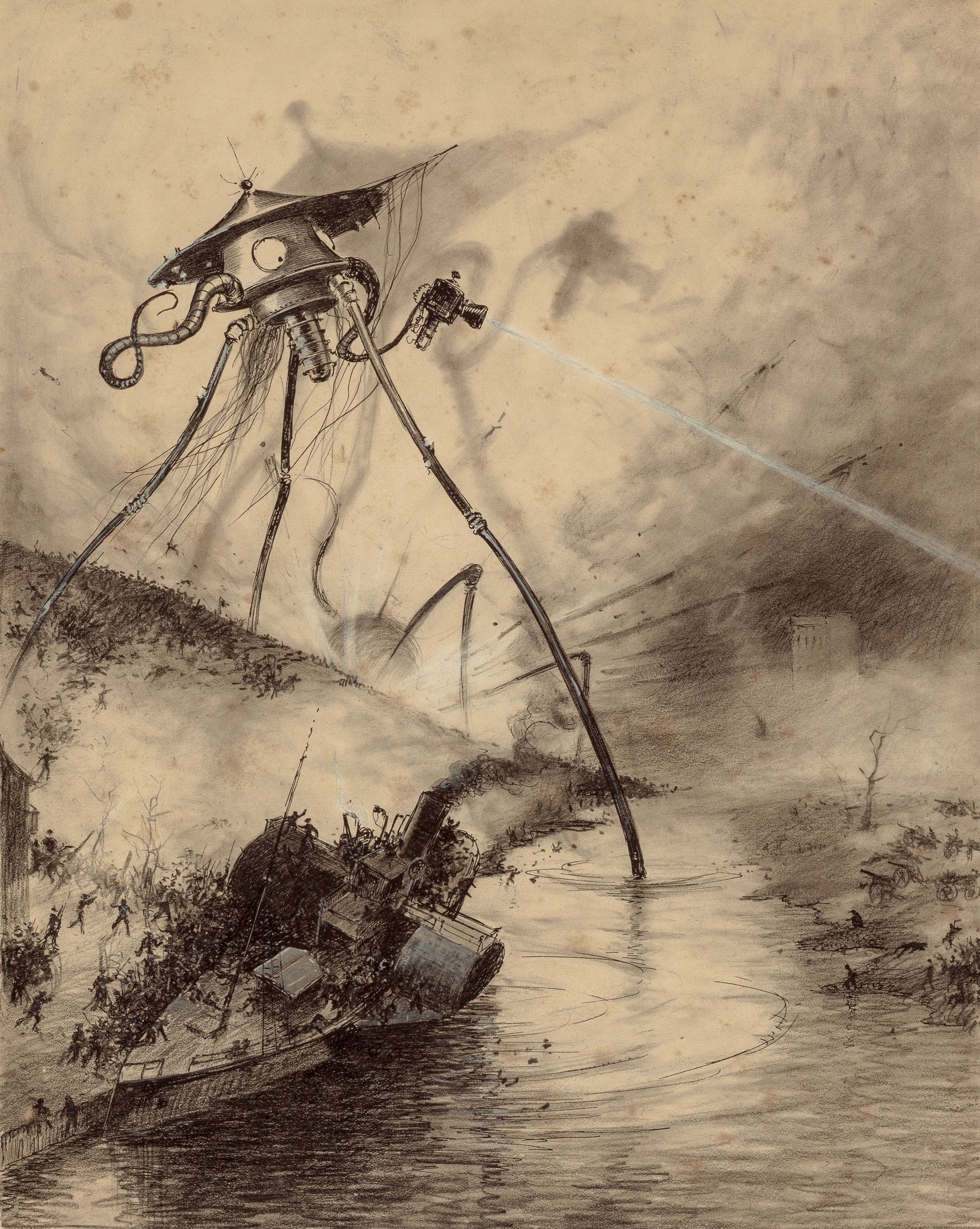
Aliens from Mars launch an invasion of Earth in H. G. Wells' The War of the Worlds, as illustrated by Henrique Alvim Corrêa in 1906.

Alien invasion or space invasion is a common feature in science fiction stories and films, in which extraterrestrial lifeforms invade Earth to exterminate and supplant human life, enslave it, harvest people for food, steal the planet's resources, or destroy the planet altogether. It can be considered as a science-fiction subgenre of the invasion literature, expanded by H. G. Wells's seminal alien invasion novel The War of the Worlds, and is a type of 'first contact' science fiction.

Experts consider the prospects of an actual invasion of Earth by extraterrestrials to be extremely unlikely, due to the enormous cost in time and resources.

== Origins ==
Stories of aliens interacting with humanity date back to at least the 2nd century A.D, such as A True Story by Lucian. The genre started to take shape in the mid-18th to early-19th century, with early proto-alien invasion stories being Micromégas by Voltaire, released in 1752. The first story to focus on malevolent aliens arriving was A History of New York by Washington Irving, released in 1809. In 1888, the first proto-alien invasion story to fully focus on aliens invading was Les Xipéhuz by the writing duo J.-H. Rosny. Les Xiléhuz would be the first alien invasion if it wasn’t for the fact that it’s never made clear in the novel if the invaders are actually aliens or not.Another proto-alien story was 1889’s Mr. Stranger’s Sealed Packet. By Hugh MacColl. Which ends with the main character marrying a Martian woman but the Martian tragically dies to earthly bacteria that she no immunity for. Sharing clear similarities to later stories as Two Planets and The War of the Worlds. Possibly even inspiring them. The genre truly started in the 1890s.

In 1898, Wells published The War of the Worlds, depicting the invasion of Victorian England by Martians equipped with advanced weaponry. It is now seen as the seminal alien invasion story and Wells is widely credited with establishing several extraterrestrial themes which were later greatly expanded by science fiction writers in the 20th century, including first contact and war between planets and their differing species. However, this is a misconception: While Wells' story became the seminal alien invasion, earlier published works established themes that Wells expanded on and made mainstream.

The first of these was the 1892 novel The Germ Growers by the Irish-Australian clergyman Robert Potter, which describes a covert invasion by metallic-like alien blobs who take on the appearance of human beings and attempt to develop a virulent disease to exterminate humanity. While not as violent as Wells’ aliens. They have far more malicious intentions. In Wells’ seminal novel, the Martians are implied to want to the surviving human population into cattle. Putting cages on their fighting machines and capturing and harvesting people for blood. Even bringing along Humanoid Martians showing they are more than willing to enslave races they have conquered. Potter's novel was not widely read.

Another novel established the concept of aliens waging war against humanity, Two Planets by Kurd Lasswitz, which deals with similar themes, however, the invaders are initially benevolent but become arrogant and start a worldwide invasion of earth.

Wells had already proposed another outcome, a more down to earth and simpler conflict for the alien invasion story in The War of the Worlds. In this proposed idea, when the Narrator meets the artilleryman the second time, the artilleryman imagines a future where humanity, hiding underground in sewers and tunnels, conducts a guerrilla war, fighting against the Martians for generations to come, and eventually, after learning how to duplicate Martian weapon technology, destroys the invaders and takes back the Earth.

Six weeks after publication of the novel, The Boston Post newspaper published another alien invasion story, an unauthorized sequel to The War of the Worlds, which turned the tables on the invaders. Edison's Conquest of Mars was written by Garrett P. Serviss, who described the famous inventor Thomas Edison leading a counterattack against the invaders on their home soil. Though this is actually a sequel to Fighters from Mars, a revised and unauthorised reprint of War of the Worlds, they both were first printed in The Boston Post in 1898.

The War of the Worlds was reprinted in the United States in 1927, by Hugo Gernsback in Amazing Stories. John W. Campbell, another key editor of the era, and periodic short story writer, published several alien invasion stories in the 1930s. Many well-known science fiction writers were to follow, including Isaac Asimov, Arthur C. Clarke, Clifford D. Simak, plus Robert A. Heinlein who wrote The Puppet Masters in 1951.

== Variations ==
=== Alien infiltration ===
This is a familiar variation on the alien invasion theme. In the infiltration scenario, the invaders will typically take human form and can move freely throughout human society, even to the point of taking control of command positions. The purpose of this may either be to take over the entire world through infiltration (Invasion of the Body Snatchers), or as advanced scouts meant to "soften up" Earth in preparation for a full-scale invasion by the aliens' conventional military (First Wave). This type of invasion represented common fears of the American public during the Cold War, particularly the fear of infiltration by communist agents. The Reptilian conspiracy theory claims that covert alien infiltration is already happening.

=== Beneficial alien invasion ===
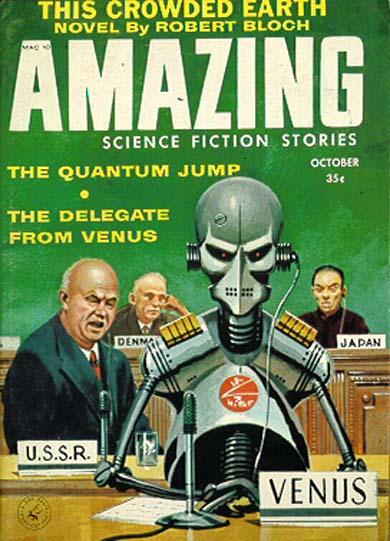
In Henry Slesar's 1958 story The Delegate from Venus, an alien robot cautions that Earth will be destroyed if its people do not learn to live in peace.

This theme has also been explored in fiction on the rare occasion. With this type of story, the invaders, in a kind of little grey/green man's burden, colonize the planet in an effort to spread their culture and "civilize" the indigenous "barbaric" inhabitants or secretly watch and aid earthlings saving them from themselves. The former theme shares many traits with hostile occupation fiction, but the invaders tend to view the occupied peoples as students or equals rather than subjects and slaves. The latter theme of secret watcher is a paternalistic/maternalistic theme. In this fiction, the aliens intervene in human affairs to prevent them from destroying themselves, such as Klaatu and Gort in The Day the Earth Stood Still warning the leaders of Earth to abandon their warlike ways and join other space-faring civilizations else that they will destroy themselves or be destroyed by their interstellar union. Other examples of a beneficial alien invasion are Gene Roddenberry's movie The Questor Tapes (1974) and his Star Trek episode "Assignment: Earth" (1968); Arthur C. Clarke's Childhood's End, the novel (later anime) series Crest of the Stars, the film Arrival (2016), and David Brin's Uplift Universe series of books.

=== Invasion by humans ===
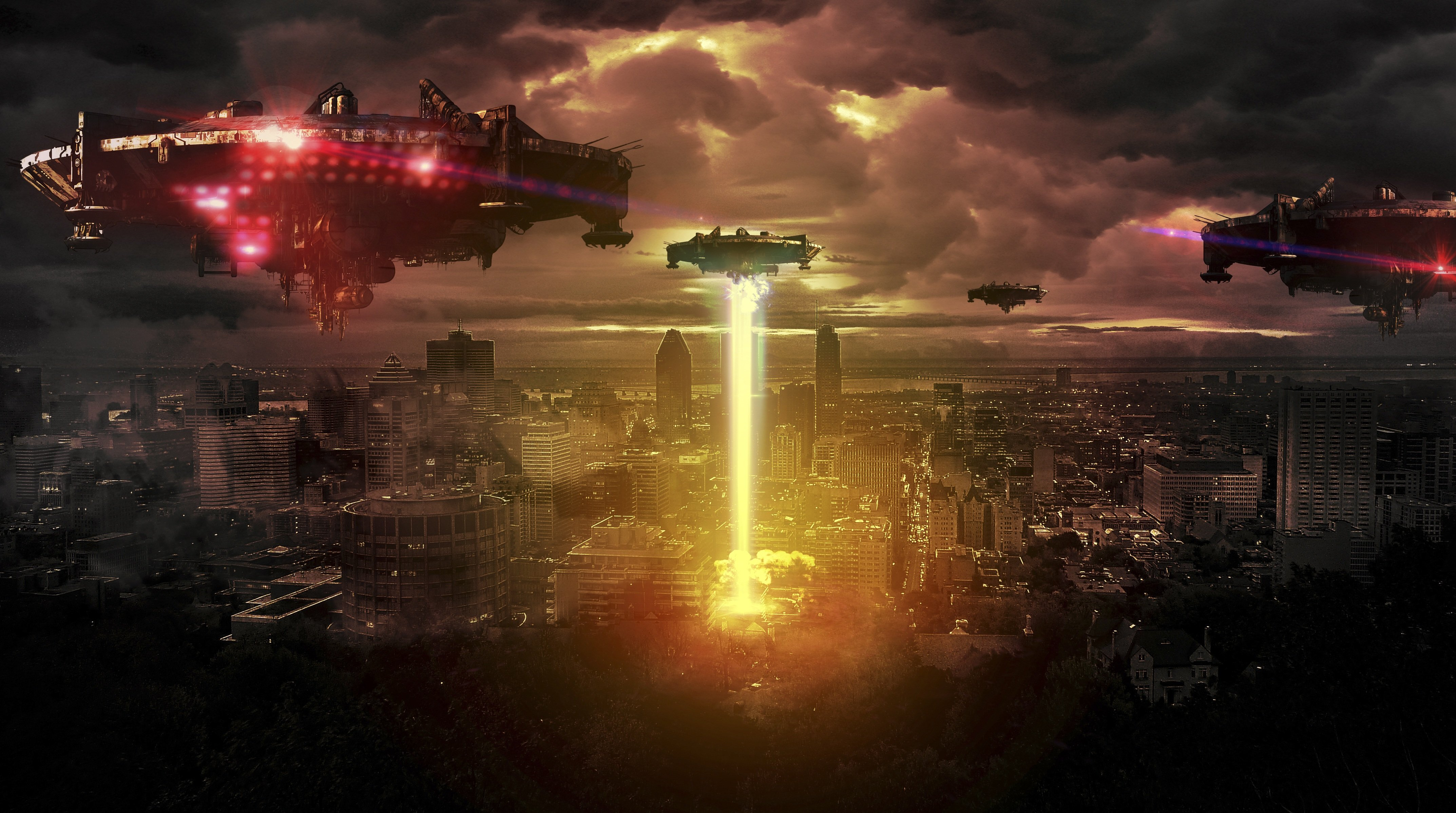
Illustration of how alien invasions are often depicted in contemporary popular culture such as modern science fiction films

A similar trope depicts humans in the role of the "alien" invaders, where humans are the ones invading or attacking extraterrestrial lifeforms. Examples include the short story Sentry (1954) (in which the "aliens" described are, at the end, explained to be humans), the video game Phantasy Star II (1989), The Martian Chronicles by Ray Bradbury, the Imperium of Man in the Warhammer 40,000 universe, Invaders from Earth by Robert Silverberg, Ender's Game by Orson Scott Card, and the movies Battle for Terra (2007), Planet 51 (2009), and Avatar (2009–present).

== Feasibility ==
Seth Shostak, senior astronomer at the Search for Extraterrestrial Intelligence (SETI) believes an alien invasion of Earth to be unlikely for several reasons. He believes that any resources available on Earth can be found on their home planet, or that it would be easier to locate or create it on their own. He also believes that, if alien life were to make contact with Earth, it would first be through robots rather than the aliens themselves. David Morrison, Director of Space at NASA-Ames Research Center argues that first contact would be in the form of radio communication rather than visitation.

== See also ==
- Interplanetary contamination
- Potential cultural impact of extraterrestrial contact
- Space colonization
- UFO religion
- The Kraken Wakes, 1953 novel
- List of films featuring space stations
- Wow! signal
