= Mr. Stranger's Sealed Packet =

1889 novel by Hugh MacColl

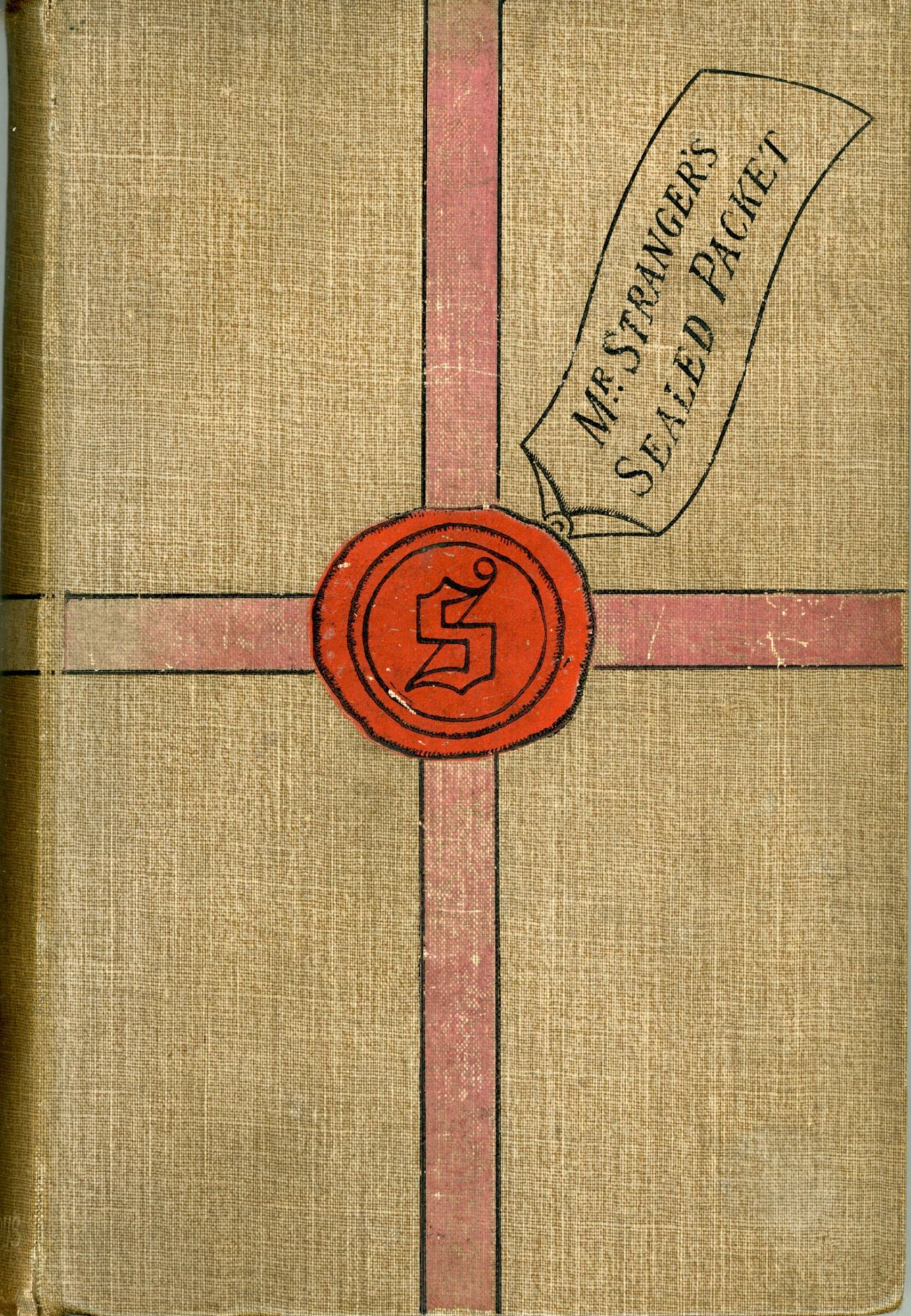
- 1st Edition Cover
- Author: Hugh MacColl
- Language: English
- Genre: Science fiction
- Publisher: Chatto & Windus
- Publication date: April, 1889
- Media type: Print (Hardcover and Paperback)

Mr. Stranger's Sealed Packet is a short novel by Hugh MacColl. It was first published in English in April of 1889. The novel went out of print in 1898.

The novel deals with a journey to Mars in a flying machine and describes the history and customs of the Martians, depicting a scientifically advanced utopian society.

== Synopsis ==
The son of an inventor named Mr. Stranger Jr. Goes on a voyage to Mars, by using his father’s inventions. Upon arriving on Mars he meets the Grensum, blue skinned hominid Martians. Who live in a Utopian society. Mars is also populated by a Martian race of barbarians known as the Dergdunin. After helping in a conflict between the two races. Mr. Stranger falls in love with a female Grensum. And marries her, taking her back to Earth. Unfortunately his Martian bride dies to Earthly bacteria that which she has no immunity to.

== See Also ==
- Extraterrestrials in fiction
- Alien Invasion
- Two Planets
- The War of the Worlds
