= The Unparalleled Adventure of One Hans Pfaall =

1835 science fiction short story by Edgar Allan Poe

- Short story by Edgar Allan Poe
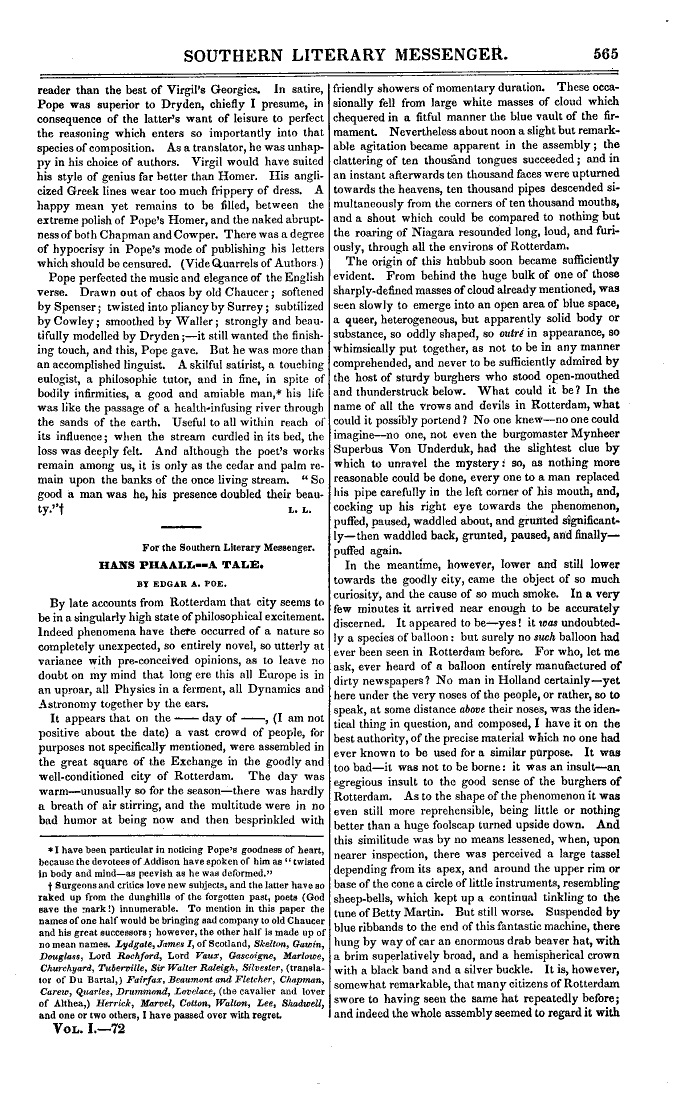

Text available at Wikisource
- Original title: Hans Phaall -- A Tale
- Country: United States
- Language: English
- Genres: Science fiction, hoax

Publication
- Publisher: Southern Literary Messenger
- Media type: Print (periodical)
- Publication date: June 1835

"The Unparalleled Adventure of One Hans Pfaall" (1835) is a short story by Edgar Allan Poe. The story is regarded as one of the early examples of the modern science fiction genre. The story traces the journey of a voyage to the Moon.

The story appeared in three versions with three different titles: "Hans Phaall --- A Tale", "Lunar Discoveries. Extraordinary Aerial Voyage", and "The Unparalleled Adventure of One Hans Pfaall".

== Plot summary ==
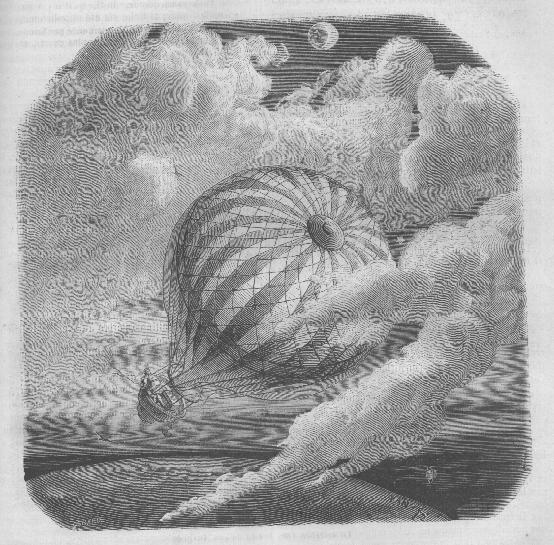
Yan' Dargent's illustration of "The Unparalleled Adventure of One Hans Pfaall" ("Voyage d'Hans Pfaall à la lune") for Jules Verne's Edgar Poe et ses œuvres (1864)

The story opens with the delivery to a crowd gathered in Rotterdam of a manuscript detailing the journey to the moon by Hans Pfaall. The letter is brought by balloon by an inhabitant of the moon. He had been sent by Pfaall to Rotterdam with the letter for Burgomaster Superbus Von Underduk after an absence of five years. The manuscript, which comprises the majority of the story, sets out in detail how Hans Pfaall, a mender of bellows, contrived to reach the Moon by benefit of a revolutionary new balloon and a device which compresses the vacuum of space into breathable air. The journey takes him nineteen days.

The narrative includes descriptions of the Earth from space as well as the descent to its fiery, volcanic satellite. He lands successfully on the moon and discovers that it is inhabited by life forms similar to humans, but being shorter and without ears. The inhabitants of the moon live in cities.

He makes two major discoveries about the moon: that there is life on the moon, and that it is active with volcanoes.

Pfaall withholds most of the information regarding the surface of the Moon and its inhabitants in order to negotiate a pardon from the Burgomaster for several murders he committed as he left Earth to escape creditors of his who were becoming irksome. After reading the manuscript, the city authorities agree that Pfaall should be pardoned, but the messenger who brought them the text, a resident of the Moon who is two feet tall and without ears, has vanished and they are unable to restore communication with him.

== Publication history ==
The story was published in the June 1835 issue of the monthly magazine Southern Literary Messenger as "Hans Phaall -- A Tale", intended by Poe to be a hoax. If Poe had plans to continue the hoax in further installments, he was pre-empted by the Great Moon Hoax which started in the August 25, 1835 issue of the New York Sun daily newspaper. Poe later wrote that the satirical tone of the story made it easy for readers to see through the supposed hoax.

The New York Transcript newspaper reprinted the Poe story as "Lunar Discoveries" in the Wednesday morning, September 2, 1835 edition. Poe was not acknowledged as the author of "Lunar Discoveries" to make it appear more like a news story or dispatch. The original story was entitled as "A Tale". The account appeared in four parts or installments beginning on September 2 and continuing through September 5. The story was modified to present it as an objective and factual account, downplaying the satirical and comical aspects of the original appearance of the story.

== Inspiration ==
Poe was inspired by the 1827 novel A Voyage to the Moon by George Tucker, under whom Poe studied at the University of Virginia while Tucker was chairman of the faculty there. Harry Harrison and Malcolm Edwards, in the 1979 book Spacecraft in Fact and Fiction, comment that Tucker's story "may [...] have been responsible" for Poe's, while J. O. Bailey writes that Poe's story "certainly owes a great deal" to Tucker's, and Adam Roberts goes so far as to say that "Poe plagiarised several pages". Bailey, in a 1942 article in the Publications of the Modern Language Association of America analyzing Poe's sources for several stories including "Hans Pfaall", identifies several parallels between the two stories including references to lightheadedness or loss of consciousness upon experiencing problems with the air supply, mistaking the Moon for Earth following the reversal of gravity (bouleversement) along the journey, and the first-person narrator deferring discussion of scientific discoveries for personal reasons but promising to publish them separately later. Bailey concludes that Poe's sources for the story are varied and complex but that significant amounts of material are traceable to Tucker's book and that this cannot be explained by familiarity with the review of A Voyage to the Moon published in the American Quarterly Review in March 1828 (which had previously been posited as the explanation as Poe had made reference to the review in a note to the 1840 edition of "Hans Pfaall") as some commonalities between Tucker's story and Poe's are not mentioned in the review.

== Literary significance ==
Poe's story had an influence on, and is referenced in, Jules Verne's From the Earth to the Moon (1865), which can be seen as a retelling of the story. Verne acknowledged Poe as the creator of the "scientific novel" when he referred to him as 'le créateur du roman merveilleux scientifique'.

The story is thought to have inspired "The Great Moon Hoax" by Richard Adams Locke which was published a month after the Poe hoax. Poe had re-published the story under the new title "Lunar Discoveries: Extraordinary Aerial Voyage" as written by Baron Hans Phaall, the "celebrated Dutch Astronomer and Aeronaut". The original story had appeared in the June issue of the Southern Literary Messenger. It appeared a month before The Sun "Great Moon Hoax" in August. The story was a satire of the anticipation of the appearance of Halley's Comet that year. The story was about a journey by balloon to the moon. Poe maintained that the "Great Moon Hoax" in The Sun used his story as an inspiration and influence. This printing of the Poe story gave the author as Baron Hans Phaall as an eyewitness account of the events described.

== See also ==
- Moon in science fiction
- "The Balloon-Hoax" (1844), also by Poe
