= A Voyage to the Moon (Tucker novel) =

1827 science fiction novel by George Tucker

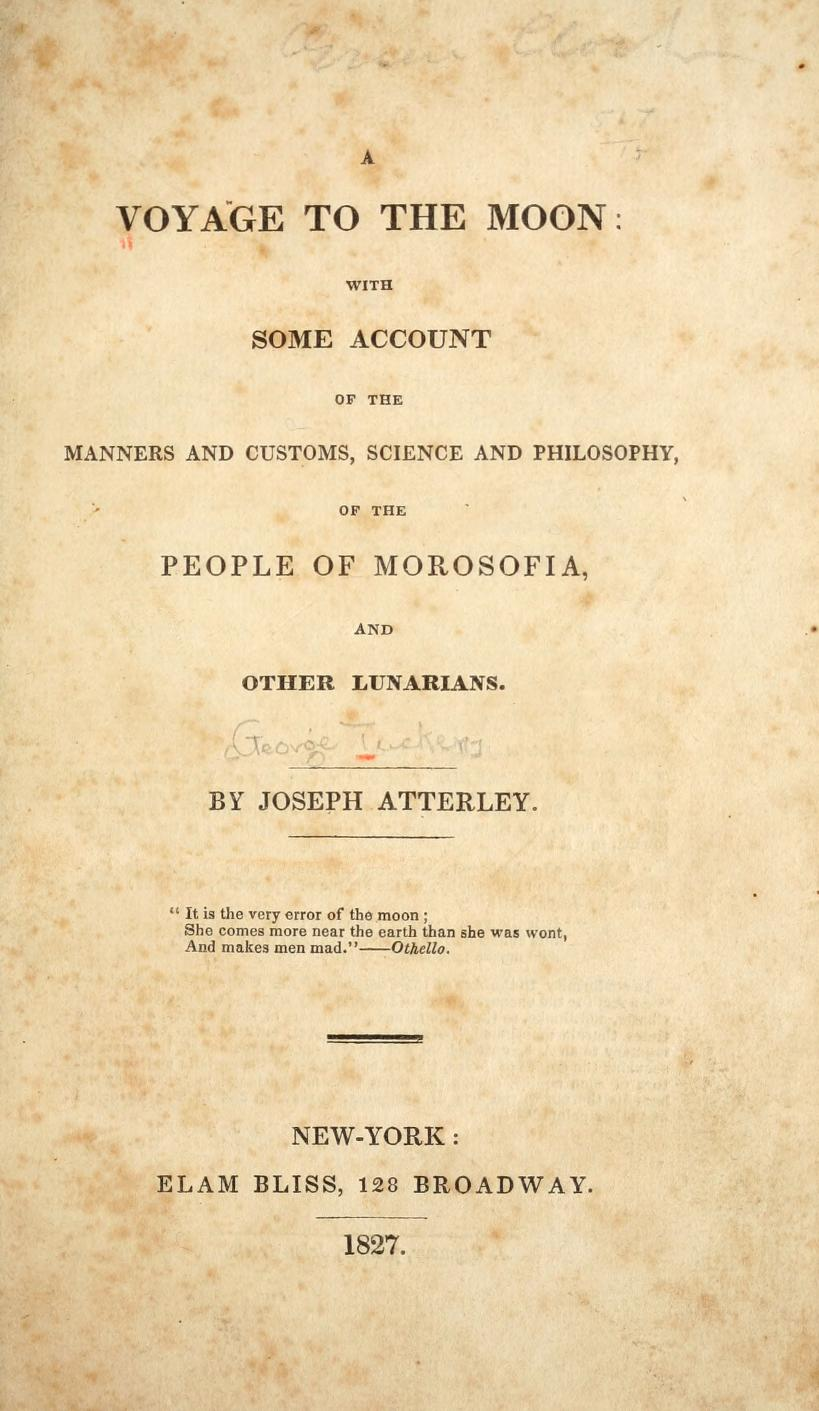
- Title page
- Author: George Tucker
- Language: English
- Genre: Science fiction
- Publisher: Elam Bliss
- Publication date: 1827
- Publication place: United States
- Media type: Print
- Pages: iv + 264
- OCLC: 191257804
- Text: A Voyage to the Moon (Tucker novel) at Project Gutenberg

A Voyage to the Moon: With Some Account of the Manners and Customs, Science and Philosophy, of the People of Morosofia, and Other Lunarians is an 1827 science fiction novel by George Tucker published under the pseudonym "Joseph Atterley", the story's fictional main character who travels to the Moon using a material with anti-gravitational properties. Two different countries on the Moon are depicted: Morosofia, a vehicle for satire on contemporary issues, and Okalbia, a utopia. The book received positive reviews upon release and was a relative commercial success. The satire was found by contemporary reviewers to be at times impenetrable, while later reviewers have found it to have aged significantly.

The book's place in the history of science fiction is that of an early work from the United States, and part of established traditions of fictional lunar voyages and works of satire. In terms of specific works, it took inspiration from Jonathan Swift's 1726 novel Gulliver's Travels and influenced Edgar Allan Poe's 1835 short story "The Unparalleled Adventure of One Hans Pfaall" in turn. A Voyage to the Moon contains one of the earliest instances of the anti-gravity theme and the notion that outer space is a cold and airless void. Scholars have written about what can be gleaned about Tucker's personal views from the book, in particular his depiction of an ideal society and discussion between characters about matters of racial differences.

== Synopsis ==
New York resident Joseph Atterley goes on a voyage around the world following the death of his wife. He is shipwrecked off the coast of Burma, where he is taken captive and meets a Brahmin by the name of Gurameer. Gurameer tells Atterley that he has discovered an exotic metallic substance called "Lunarium", which has the peculiar property of being repelled from the Earth while simultaneously being attracted to the Moon. Gurameer, who claims to have been to the Moon before, suggests that they travel there. Together, they construct an airtight spaceship in the form of a six-foot (1.8 m) copper cube with iron reinforcements, and coat it with Lunarium. They enter the vessel and cut the ropes attaching it to the ground, whereupon it lifts off. While in space, they breathe from a supply of condensed air aboard the spacecraft. The journey to the Moon takes three days. Along the way, they look upon the Earth and reflect upon various social and political issues, speculate about the origin of the Moon, and experience a reversal of gravity as they come nearer to their destination.

Upon arrival, they find that the Moon has an atmosphere so thin it is not detectable from Earth, but still breathable. Their landing spot is in the country of Morosofia, inhabited by tall humans; among them is a foolish race called Glonglims. Atterley is confounded by the various peculiar habits of the Morosofians. Among other things, they practice a kind of non-lethal trial by combat wherein law cases are settled by prize fights and the rules to declare a winner are unclear, their religion mandates that they walk backwards down stairs at certain times of the calendar, and physicians are engaged with theories of disease rather than treating patients. The Earthlings then move on to the country of Okalbia, which is a kind of utopia. The Okalbians practice a form of voluntary population control, have abolished the death penalty, and have no problems arising from wealth inequality. Eventually, Atterley and Gurameer return to Earth. Gurameer relates his life story to Atterley before going on further travels; Atterley returns to New York after a four-year absence, where nobody believes his story of the lunar voyage, and swears off traveling for good.

== Publication history ==
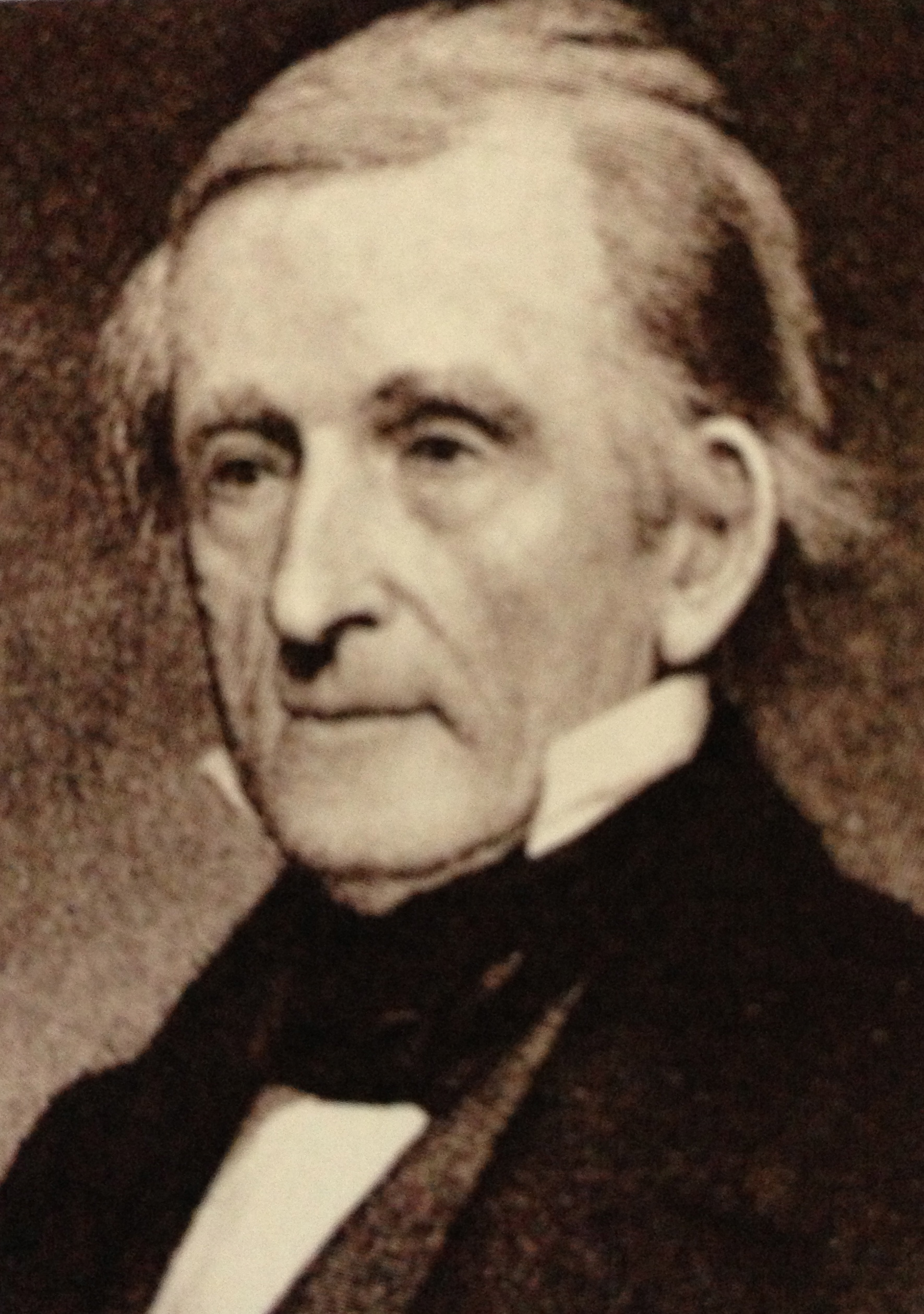
Author George Tucker (pictured in 1845)

A Voyage to the Moon was written by George Tucker (1775–1861), a former three-term member of the United States House of Representatives (1819–1825) who was at the time a professor at the newly founded University of Virginia. It was Tucker's second novel, following his 1824 debut The Valley of Shenandoah. A Voyage to the Moon was originally published in 1827 by Elam Bliss under the pseudonym Joseph Atterley. It was reprinted under Tucker's real name by Gregg Press in 1975, including an introduction by David G. Hartwell and an anonymous review (Note: In his 1862 "Obituary Notice of Prof. George Tucker" in the Proceedings of the American Philosophical Society, Robley Dunglison identifies himself as the author of the review.) originally printed in the March 1828 edition of American Quarterly Review.

== Reception ==
=== Contemporary ===
Upon release, the book received favorable reviews. The anonymous March 1828 review in the American Quarterly Review summarized the story at length and praised the satirical elements in particular, finding them good-natured and free from maliciousness against the subjects of the satire, while lamenting the lack of footnotes or other measures to make the intentions of the author more apparent to readers. Another anonymous March 1828 review, this one in the Western Monthly Review, likewise provided an in-depth summary and praised the talents of the author, while finding the satire occasionally too difficult to decipher; the reviewer considered the late portion of book retelling Gurameer's life story to be the best part. Both reviews likened the book to Jonathan Swift's 1726 novel Gulliver's Travels and found the inspiration to be obvious; the reviewer in Western Monthly Review nevertheless deemed the differences between the works to be significant enough for A Voyage to the Moon to be considered original. The book was also a comparative commercial success, selling a thousand copies and netting Tucker $100 (equivalent to $2,800 in 2025).

=== Later ===
Tucker's biographer Robert Colin McLean finds A Voyage to the Moon to be technically superior as a piece of writing to all of his previous works, while nevertheless finding the structure to be "no more than a casual linking together of anecdotal essays within a contrived framework". McLean comments upon what he perceives as a curious decision to conclude what he describes as "intellectual satire" with the "sentimental romance" of Gurameer's life story, writing that this was probably a gambit to broaden the book's appeal and that it appears to have been successful at that. He concludes that the book's treatment of its various subjects was timely to the point that it is now interesting mostly as a time capsule of the social and intellectual issues of the day. Science fiction scholar E. F. Bleiler, in the 1990 reference work Science-Fiction: The Early Years, finds the book's principal flaw to be an underdevelopment of otherwise good ideas throughout large portions of the text, but describes finding amusement and enjoyment in the book nevertheless. Bleiler summarizes his overall impression of the book as "pleasant".

== Analysis ==
=== Place in science fiction history ===
Atterley's narrative is important in at least three ways to the history of interplanetary voyages: It is the initial American venture into the field; his ship is the first to be coated with an antigravity coating; and more than any of his predecessors, he introduced into the text discussions of scientific data for their own sake ...

— Neil Barron, Anatomy of Wonder: A Critical Guide to Science Fiction (1981). Note that Barron is mistaken about this being the first US story of interplanetary travel.

The book features one of the earliest instances of anti-gravity in fiction. It is the first anti-gravitational metal, the first example of anti-gravity being treated as a matter of science rather than a supernatural phenomenon, (Note: The Encyclopedia of Science Fiction lists one earlier story containing a variation on the antigravity theme: Francis Godwin's posthumously-published 1638 novel The Man in the Moone, where a "semi-magical" stone can make gravity stronger or weaker.) and the first time anti-gravity was used for space travel in science fiction. Tucker's "Lunarium" is considered a predecessor of the "Cavorite" depicted in H. G. Wells's 1900–1901 serial The First Men in the Moon. Russell Freedman comments that following the publication of A Voyage to the Moon, "Anti-gravity spaceships dominated science fiction for the next hundred years or so".

It is also one of the earliest examples of attempting to portray space travel realistically in terms of the actual conditions of outer space. The notion that space is a vacuum (or void) was not general knowledge at the time, even among scientists. Keith Deutsch, in the 1980 book Space Travel in Fact and Fiction, credits Tucker's novel with being "the first to describe space as a bitter cold void where unprotected life could not exist". The spacecraft in the book is constructed to be airtight, has an onboard supply of breathable air in the form of tanks, and incorporates thermal insulation against the extreme temperatures of outer space. Inasmuch as it deals with these considerations, Harry Harrison and Malcolm Edwards, in the 1979 book Spacecraft in Fact and Fiction, deem it "the first reasonable spaceship design".

A Voyage to the Moon inhabits an early position in the history of American science fiction literature, being described as "a central precursor" by The Encyclopedia of Science Fiction and a "prototype" by Peter Leighton in the 1960 book Moon Travellers: A Dream That Is Becoming a Reality, and by some accounts constitutes the country's first science fiction novel. It is sometimes described as the earliest US story of interplanetary travel, though Sam Moskowitz points to George Fowler's 1813 novel A Flight to the Moon; or, The Vision of Randalthus as an earlier example. It also contains what might be the first depiction of artificial enclosures for space farming in fiction.

A diagram of J. L. Hilton's analysis of Voyage to the Moon's antecedents

In terms of antecedents, J. L. Hilton, in a 2005 article in Akroterion, identifies the novel as belonging to several literary traditions that were already well-established at the time. One of these is the speculation about conditions on the Moon that had earlier appeared in works like Johannes Kepler's posthumously published 1634 novel Somnium and Francis Godwin's posthumously published 1638 novel The Man in the Moone; J. O. Bailey writes about the lunar voyage tradition that Tucker "add[ed] to the established patterns several features of importance" including the use of anti-gravity and the notion that space is a cold and airless void. Another is the satirical tradition of works like Swift's Gulliver's Travels and the various stories about Baron von Münchhausen. Many others have also compared the book to Gulliver's Travels; for instance, James Fieser describes A Voyage to the Moon as "modeled after Swift's Gulliver's Travels" and Joel Nydahl writes in the 1980 book America as Utopia that it is "obviously derivative" of Swift's work. Nydahl further comments that A Voyage to the Moon comes the closest of all the American works of satirical utopian fiction to matching the quality of Gulliver's Travels—James Fenimore Cooper's 1835 novel The Monikins being the only possible contender. I. F. Clarke views Tucker's Lunarium as akin to the lodestone that keeps Swift's flying island of Laputa airborne, while Vesselin M. Budakov in the 2020 book Swiftian Inspirations more modestly considers it a "slight allusion". Bailey finds Tucker's Glonglims reminiscent of Swift's Laputan scientists.

==== Edgar Allan Poe's "Hans Pfaall" (1835) ====
Edgar Allan Poe, who studied at the University of Virginia in 1826 while Tucker was chairman of the faculty there, is known to have read the book and drawn inspiration from it for his 1835 short story "The Unparalleled Adventure of One Hans Pfaall". Harrison and Edwards comment that Tucker's story "may ... have been responsible" for Poe's, while Bailey writes that Poe's story "certainly owes a great deal" to Tucker's, and Adam Roberts goes so far as to say that "Poe plagiarised several pages". Bailey, in a 1942 article in the Publications of the Modern Language Association of America analyzing Poe's sources for several stories including "Hans Pfaall", identifies several parallels between the two stories. These include references to lightheadedness or loss of consciousness upon experiencing problems with the air supply, mistaking the Moon for Earth following the reversal of gravity (bouleversement) along the journey, and the first-person narrator deferring discussion of scientific discoveries for personal reasons but promising to publish them separately later. Bailey concludes that Poe's sources for the story are varied and complex but that significant amounts of material are traceable to Tucker's book and that this cannot be explained by familiarity with the review of A Voyage to the Moon in the American Quarterly Review (which had previously been posited as the explanation as Poe had made reference to the review in a note to the 1840 edition of "Hans Pfaall") as some commonalities between Tucker's story and Poe's are not mentioned in the review.

=== Satire ===
Tucker's depiction of Morosofia is a vehicle for satire. He had previously written several works with satirical elements, mainly focusing on the affairs of the general public. By contrast, the primary target in A Voyage to the Moon was, in Tucker's own words, "the errors of the day in science and philosophy". Bleiler and McLean identify several targets of satire whose names appear in distorted form through anagrams or other kinds of wordplay including Erasmus Darwin ("Vindar"), William Godwin ("Wighurd"), and Francis Jeffrey ("Reffei"). Johann Kaspar Lavater's system of physiognomy is satirized by Avarabet, a fortune-teller who assesses people's characters and destinies from the appearance of their fingernails; the related concept of phrenology is satirized by a doctor inspecting people's hair for a similar purpose. The pedagogical theories of Johann Heinrich Pestalozzi are satirized by Lozzi Pozzi, who teaches grammar by juggling sticks. Another subject receiving a satirical treatment is the then-current debate about whether it is better to have an agrarian or industrial economy—in Morosofia, Atterley and Gurameer encounter a family engaged in a dispute about whether the children should do gardening and buy clothes with the proceeds or do textile work and make their own clothes; Gurameer takes the position that it is foolish to view these as mutually exclusive options. The book nevertheless also contains satire of a more everyday nature; McLean writes that this broader satire was apparently more appreciated by the reading public. McLean finds much of it—for instance the book's depictions of lunar vanity and religious hypocrisy—to be so broad as to be uninteresting, while finding the somewhat more specific satire of the medical profession and legal system to be of greater interest. On the whole, McLean finds the satire to have aged and thus "lost much of its point"; Bailey and Willy Ley both note that some of the lunar inventions that Tucker intended to be absurd do not come across so to modern readers, such as selective breeding of animals to increase their size, a kind of powder-powered internal combustion engine, and steam cookers.

=== Utopia ===
In the story, the country of Okalbia is depicted as a utopia. Jared Gardner, in the 1998 book Master Plots: Race and the Founding of an American Literature, 1787–1845, writes that Okalbia is an obvious stand-in for the United States, pointing among other things to the story of its founding "in a time of religious fervour". Jessie Bernard, in a 1947 article in Social Forces, writes that much can be gleaned about Tucker's social and political views from his description of Okalbia inasmuch as it reflects his conception of an ideal society. In particular, Bernard infers a preference for agrarianism and decentralization, as well as some "isolationist leanings". Nydahl writes that Okalbia serves as an example of human behavior being positively influenced by the presence of well-designed institutions, and that its economy functions with minimal government intervention. Okalbia has an unequal distribution of property among its citizens at the individual level as a result of personal ambition—but no privileged classes—and everyone is content with this; it is described that the society initially had an entirely equal distribution of property that turned out not to be workable. The population of Okalbians remains at a constant figure of 150,000 or 400/sq mi (150/km^{2}) through each citizen refraining from having more children than they can comfortably support. This population control is described as being key to maintaining the utopia, and Bernard comments that it makes Tucker one of the earliest neo-Malthusianists in the United States. The method is not described in the story—though Bernard writes that it is "obviously contraceptive in nature"—and Gurameer comments to Atterley that it would likely not be practicable in the US as it would eliminate "one of the checks on licentiousness, where women are so unrestrained as they are with you" and thus might cause more problems than it solves. There is no death penalty as the criminal justice system is focused mainly on crime prevention, which is principally accomplished through education rather than punishment, and censure is directed at those responsible for the early education of the criminals instead of the criminals themselves; Bernard describes this as "pretty revolutionary criminology and penology". Other features of the utopia noted by Nydahl and Bernard include suffrage without property requirements and women being "under few restraints". Vernon Louis Parrington Jr., in the 1947 book American Dreams: A Study of American Utopias, concludes that "the Okalbians are civilized in the best sense; they have learned to appreciate simplicity".

=== Race ===
Although the book ridicules almost all intellectual debate as empty and vain, it spares one set of concerns from this critique: the question of racial difference.

— Jared Gardner, Master Plots: Race and the Founding of an American Literature, 1787–1845 (1998)

The book engages with questions of racial differences among humans. On their way to the Moon, Atterley and Gurameer gaze upon the continent on Africa and discuss issues of race–in particular, whether the apparent differences between races are inherent. On this subject of nature versus nurture, Gurameer takes the position that environment is the key determinant and that at the individual level, people are everywhere alike. Gurameer further suggests that variations in national character stem from cultural factors subject to change and not immutable natural ones; Nydahl takes this to also be Tucker's own position. Atterley questions whether the characteristics of a race could be altered by relocating to a new environment. They conclude that organic differences between races play some role. Gardner comments that during the course of the conversation, Gurameer's position shifts away from the monogenism of Samuel Stanhope Smith and towards the polygenism of Thomas Jefferson. Joan Gordon, in a 2019 review in Science Fiction Studies, writes that the book displays "casual racism and classism that one might expect in an 'antebellum' work" and that it is evident that Tucker believes in a racial hierarchy, but finds it to be "relatively mild in its expression".

== See also ==
- Moon in science fiction
