= Cavorite =

Fictional material

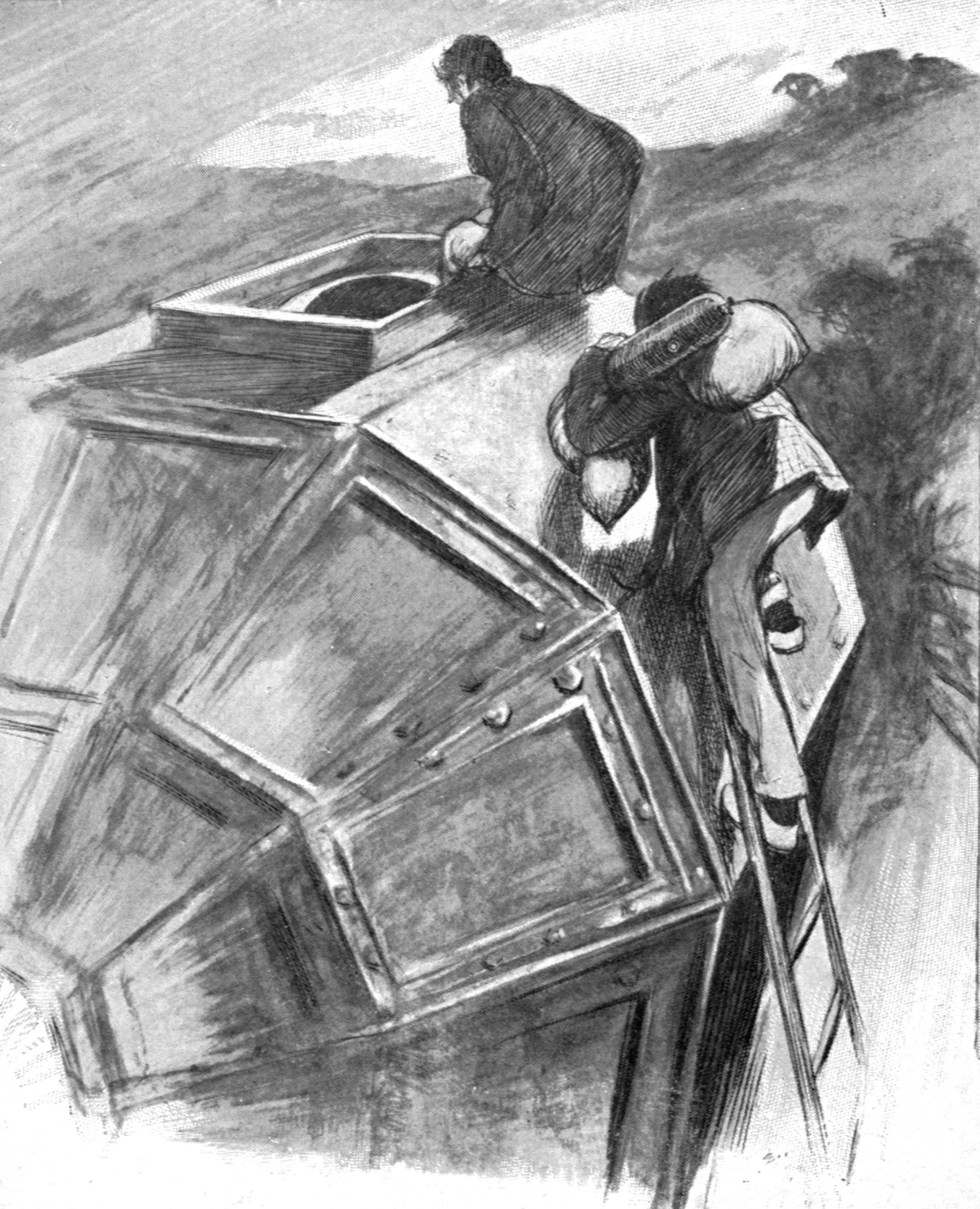
Illustration of the Cavorite-propelled spacecraft

Cavorite is a fictional material first depicted by H. G. Wells in The First Men in the Moon, a 1901 scientific romance. Developed by Cavor, a reclusive physicist, it has the ability to negate the force of gravity, enabling him and a businessman named Bedford to travel to the Moon using a spherical spacecraft propelled by Cavorite blinds. The material was later referenced in numerous works of science fiction media, and its theoretical implications have been discussed by critics.

== Creation ==
Into Other Worlds posits that Cavorite was based on a combination of lunarium, a fictional metal from A Voyage to the Moon (1827) by George Tucker, and apergy, from Across the Zodiac (1880) by Percy Greg, and that since Wells was unconcerned about the process of traveling to the Moon, he "borrowed freely from his predecessors".

== Critical analysis ==
Beyond Reason states that a material such as Cavorite is impossible in the real world, as it contradicts the laws of conservation of energy. It would allow for the instant invention of a perpetual motion machine, such as a bicycle whose wheel, partly shielded from gravity, would spin at a faster and faster pace until it reached its mechanical limits.

Natural Space in Literature calls Cavorite a "rather fantastic" invention, saying that it was only slightly more scientific than the cannon shot in Jules Verne's From the Earth to the Moon (1865), but noting that the story itself focused more on realism than Verne's did. The book describes Cavorite as a convenient plot device that turned the reader's attention to "human questions" as soon as possible, comparing it to the shield of Achilles. It notes that while critics demanded realism in science fiction, Wells created a self-consistent story within the reality he created. In contrast, Sense of Wonder: A Century of Science Fiction called Cavorite "much more fanciful" than Verne's Columbiad cannon.

The Intellectuals and the Masses hypothesizes that the disaster almost caused by Cavorite destroying the atmosphere was representative of Wells' anxiety due to overpopulation and the ecological damage it caused, due to his childhood experiences.
