= Robley Dunglison =

English-American physician

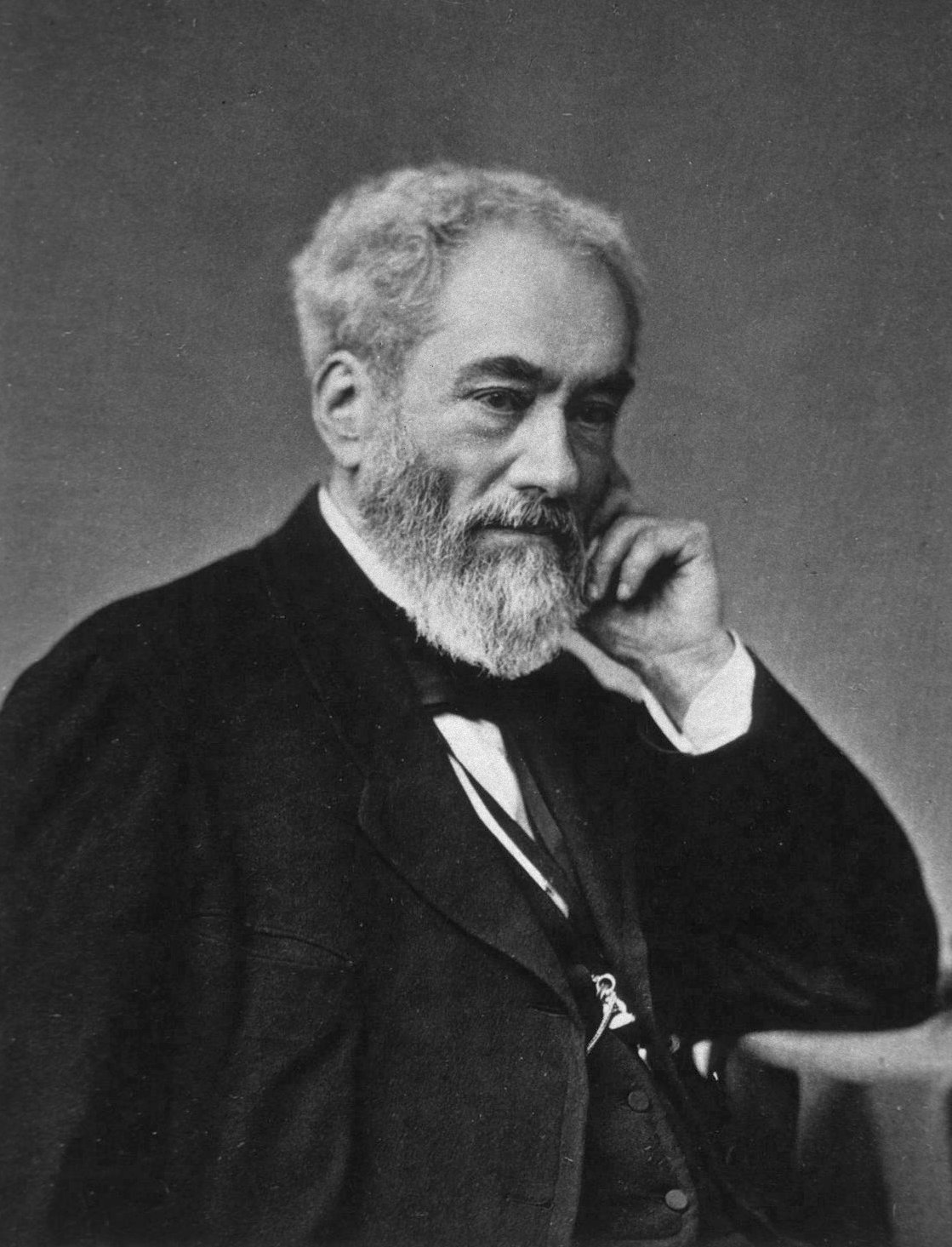
- Born: 4 January 1798; Keswick, Cumbria, England
- Died: 1 April 1869 (aged 71); Philadelphia, Pennsylvania, US
- Burial place: Laurel Hill Cemetery
- Occupations: Physician, medical educator, author
- Spouse: Harriette Leadam

Robley Dunglison (4 January 1798 – 1 April 1869) was an English-American medical doctor, medical educator and writer who served as the first full-time professor of medicine in the United States at the newly founded University of Virginia from 1825 to 1833. He authored multiple medical textbooks and is considered the "Father of American Physiology" after the publication of his landmark textbook Human Physiology in 1832. He was the personal physician to Thomas Jefferson, James Madison and James Monroe. He consulted in the treatment of Andrew Jackson and was in attendance at Jefferson's death.

He served as chair of materia medica, therapeutics, hygiene and medical jurisprudence at the University of Maryland School of Medicine from 1833 to 1836 and chair of the Institutes of Medicine and Medical Jurisprudence at Jefferson Medical College from 1836 to 1868. He assisted William Beaumont in some of his experiments on gastric digestion and published the first description of Huntington's disease in his textbook The Practice of Medicine in 1842.

== Early life and education ==
Dunglison was born in Keswick, Cumbria, England to William and Elizabeth (Robley) Dunglison. His father was a textile manufacturer but died at the age of 35. His great-uncle was a Governor of British Tobago and it was planned for Robley to become a West Indies planter but the uncle died and the plans to move to the West Indies were abandoned. He began the study of medicine locally in 1814 and moved to London to complete his studies. He attended lectures at the University of Edinburgh and the Ecole de Medecine in Paris. In 1819, he received diplomas from the Royal College of Surgeons and the Society of Apothecaries and began the practice of medicine. He obtained his M. D. from the University of Erlangen, Germany, in 1823. He received his degree remotely by submitting a thesis (De Neuralgia) and a fee since the M.D. degree was not offered in London at the time.

== Career ==
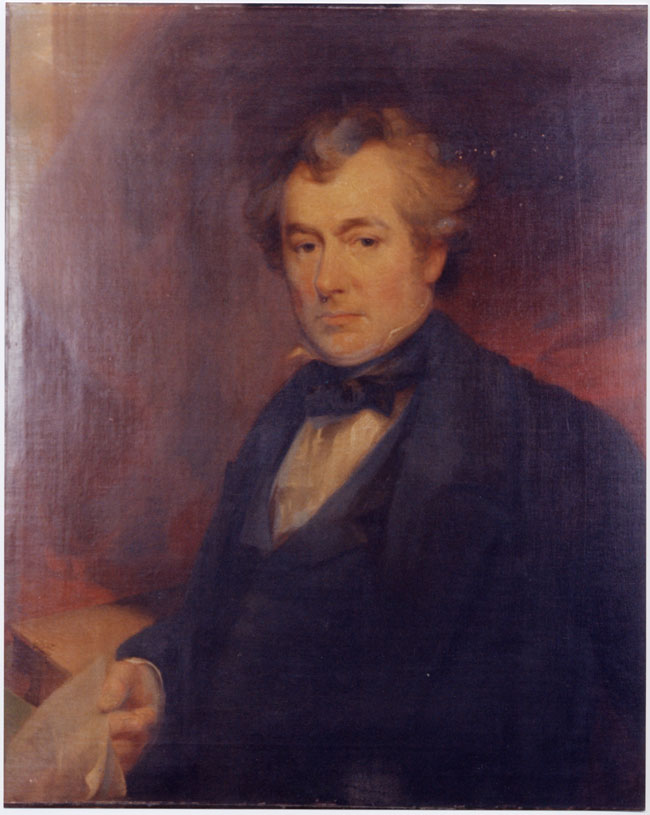
1848 Portrait of Dunglison

Dunglison initially focused on obstetrics and accepted an appointment as physician-accoucheur at the Eastern Dispensary in London. He was a member of the London Medical Society and the Hunterian Society.

In 1824, Thomas Jefferson and the Board of Visitors of the University of Virginia commissioned Francis Walker Gilmer to find professors in England for the new University. Gilmer offered the anatomy and medicine professorship to Dunglison. The agreement with the University of Virginia was that beyond medical consultation with Jefferson and select others, he would not practice medicine. This made him the first full-time professor of medicine in the United States. Dr. Dunglison and his wife arrived by ship at Norfolk, Virginia on February 10, 1825. He received an M.D. degree in 1825 from Yale College. He was chairman of the faculty of University of Virginia in 1826. John Tayloe Lomax succeeded him as chairman from 1827 until 1828, and Dunglison was appointed chairman again from 1828 until 1830.

Dunglinson was known to own slaves while at the University of Virginia and purchased some of the slaves previously owned by Thomas Jefferson.

Dunglison was the personal physician to Thomas Jefferson, James Madison and James Monroe and was called into consultation for the treatment of Andrew Jackson. He was a frequent visitor to Jefferson at Monticello and was in attendance during his illness and death in 1826.

While at the University of Virginia, Dunglison published his landmark textbook Human Physiology (1832), which established his reputation as the “Father of American Physiology.”

He took an active role in the scientific experiments on gastric digestion conducted by William Beaumont. Dunglison performed some of the experiments on gastric juice, outlined additional chemical experiments to be conducted and designed further experiments for Beaumont to conduct. He would have also published the work but deferred to Beaumont to publish the work himself.

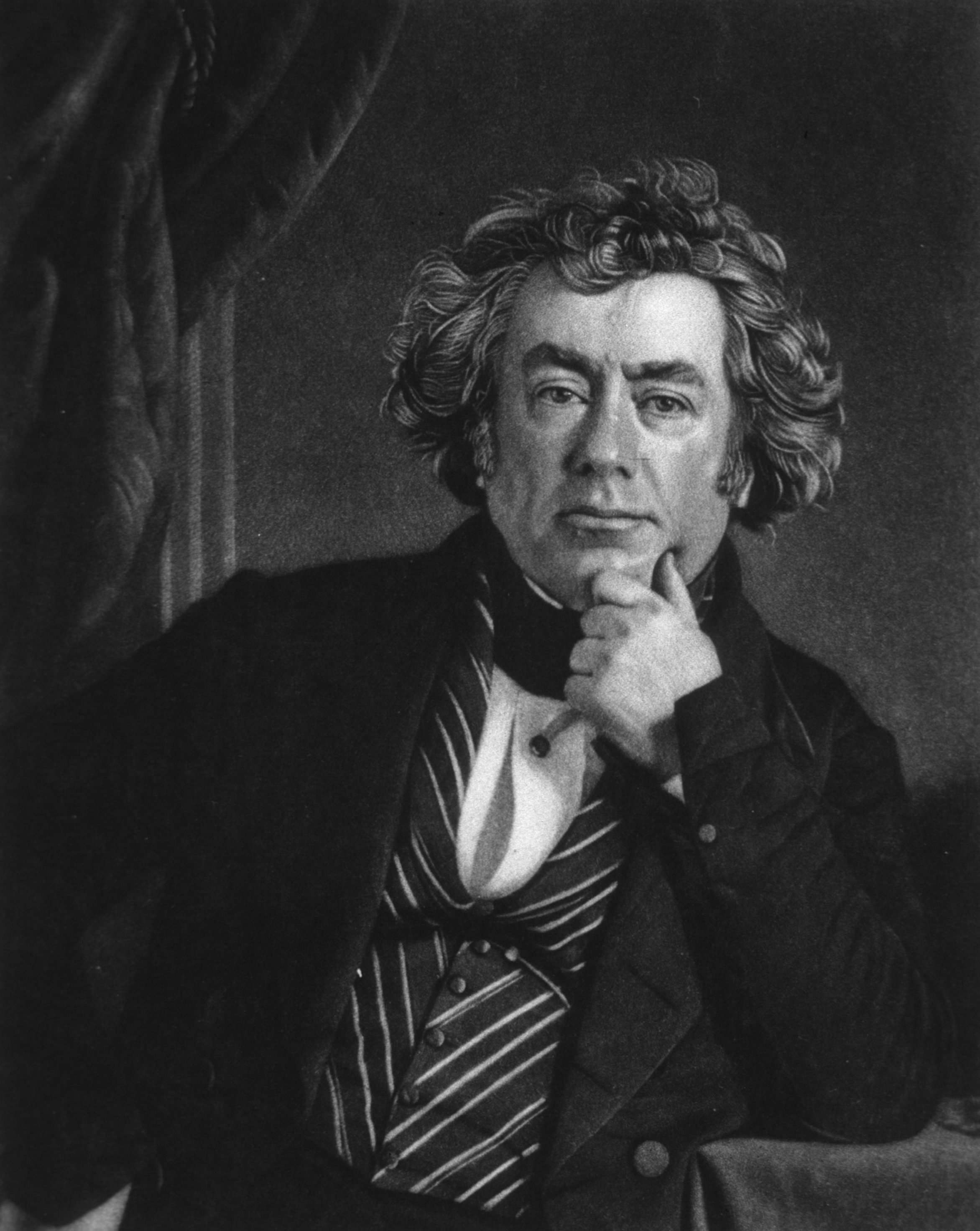
Engraving of Robley Dunglison by Alexander Hay Ritchie

In 1832, Dunglison was elected to the American Philosophical Society and served in multiple leadership roles. In 1833, he accepted a position as chair of materia medica, therapeutics, hygiene and medical jurisprudence at the University of Maryland and moved to Baltimore. In 1836, the Chair of the Institutes of Medicine and Medical Jurisprudence was created for him at the Jefferson Medical College in Philadelphia, and Dunglison served in that role until 1868. He also served as dean of faculty from 1854 to 1868. He retired in 1868 due to poor health but continued to serve as professor emeritus.

In 1837, he established a monthly publication, the American Medical Library and Intelligencer. He co-edited the journal along with Granville Sharp Pattison until 1842 when the journal was discontinued. In 1838, Dunglison became a naturalized U.S. citizen.

In 1840, Dunglison was appointed by Jefferson Medical College as a representative to the National Medical Convention for the revision of the United States Pharmacopeia. He was also personal physician to Peter Stephen Du Ponceau toward the end of his life.

Dunglison successfully campaigned for the creation of an asylum for Philadelphia's mentally ill residents. In 1844, he became an officer at the Pennsylvania Institution for the Instruction of the Blind (later known as Overbrook School for the Blind). He co-developed a form of raised type to allow the blind to read. He served as president of The Musical Fund Society and was a member of the Franklin Institute. He worked as an attending physician at Philadelphia General Hospital.

He received an honorary LL.D. degree from Jefferson College in Canonsburg, Pennsylvania in 1852.

=== First description of Huntington's disease ===
One of Dunglison's recently graduated students at Jefferson Medical College, Charles Oscar Waters, provided his professor with a description of the "magrums" (a folk name for what is now called Huntington's disease), which Waters observed was prevalent in Westchester County, New York.

Although he had never seen a case, Dunglison included a description of the disease in his 1842 textbook The Practice of Medicine. Waters's account of the disease was one of the first to note that the disease is hereditary, "within the third generation at farthest."

Another of Dunglison's students at Jefferson, Charles R. Gorman, wrote his thesis on the magrums as well.

== Family ==
Dunglinson married Harriette Leadam on 4 October 1824. Together they had seven children including:

- Harriette Elizabeth (1825 – 1841)
- John Robley (1829 – 1896), newspaper editor, politician
- a son, born in November 1827, died of bronchitis at 11 months
- William Leadam (1832 – 1891), merchant
- Richard James (1834 – 1901) -- Physician and editor of the first American edition of Gray's Anatomy in 1859
- Thomas Randolph (1837-1920), physician, died at Rosny-sous-Bois, France
- Emma Mary (1840-1916), married John Browne, Capt. in British Army, died in Charlton, London

== Death and legacy ==
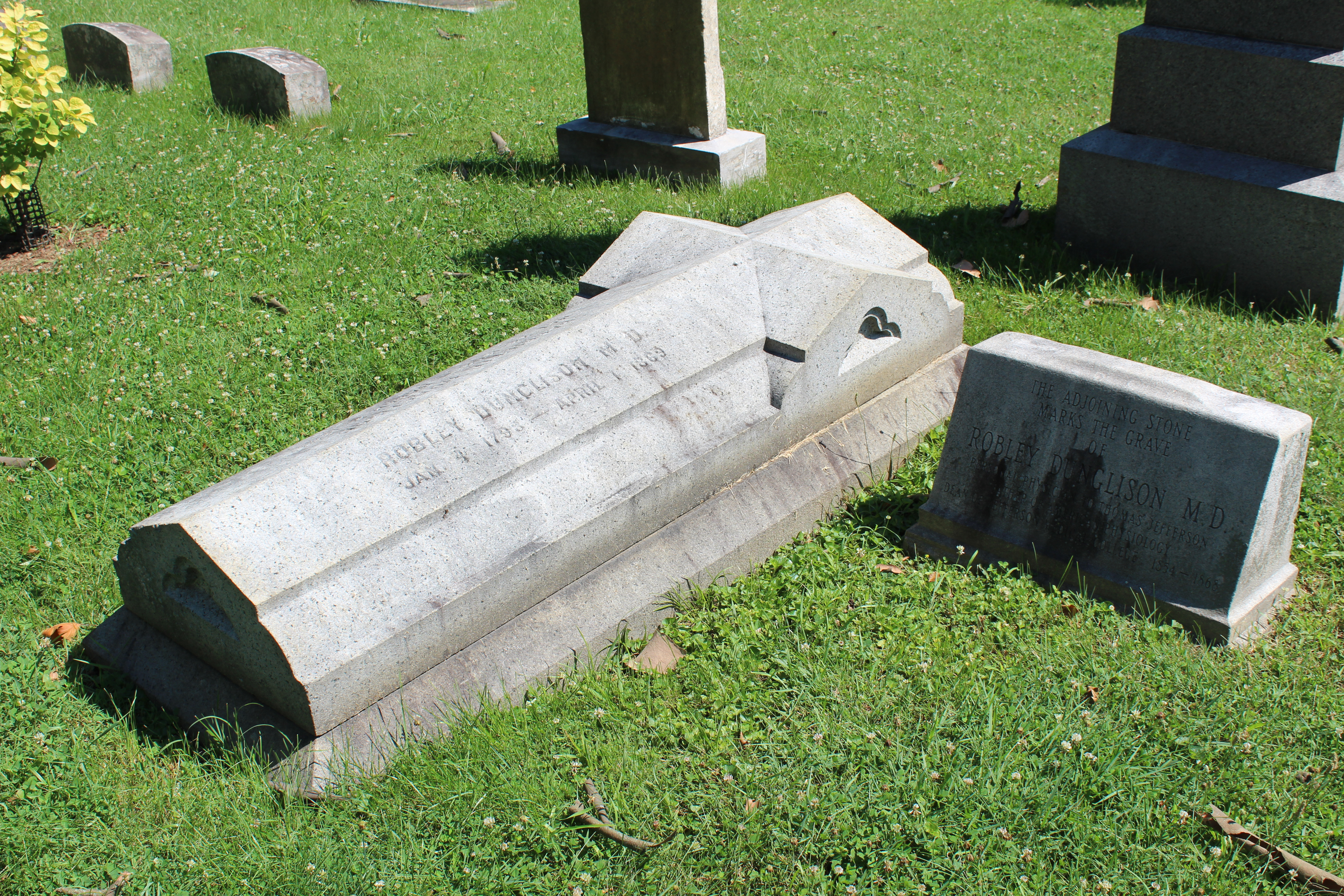
Robley Dunglison gravestone in Laurel Hill Cemetery

He died on 1 April 1869 and was interred at Laurel Hill Cemetery. A dormitory at the University of Virginia was named in his honor.

== Bibliography ==
- Commentaries on Diseases of the Stomach and Bowels of Children, G.B. Whittaker, London, 1824
- Human Physiology, 1832
- A New Dictionary of Medical Science and Literature. The 1st (1833), The 2nd (1839), 3rd (1842), and 5th (1845) editions added "Medical Lexicon" to the title page.
- The Medical Student; or, Aids to the Study of Medicine, 1837
- New Remedies: The Method of Preparing and Administering Them; Their Effects on the Healthy and Diseased Economy, &c., Lea & Blanchard, Philadelphia, 1841
- The Practice of Medicine; or, A Treatise on Special Pathology and Therapeutics, Lea & Blanchard, Philadelphia, 1842
- Medical Lexicon: A Dictionary of Medical Science, Blanchard and Lea, Philadelphia, 1857

== Sources ==
- Dorsey, John M., ed. (1960) The Jefferson-Dunglison Letters. Charlottesville: University Press of Virginia.
- Lonsdale, Henry (1875). The Worthies of Cumberland. Ballantyne & Company.
- Radbill, Samuel X. (1963). The Autobiographical Ana of Robley Dunglison, M.D. Transactions of the American Philosophical Society, new ser., v. 53, pt. 8. The American Philosophical Society.
