= Transient loss of consciousness =

Transient loss of consciousness (TLOC) is a brief period of unconsciousness which resolves spontaneously. It may be traumatic—as in a concussion—or non-traumatic in origin. Common causes of non-traumatic TLOC include syncope and epileptic seizures.
