= George Tucker (author) =

American politician (1775–1861)

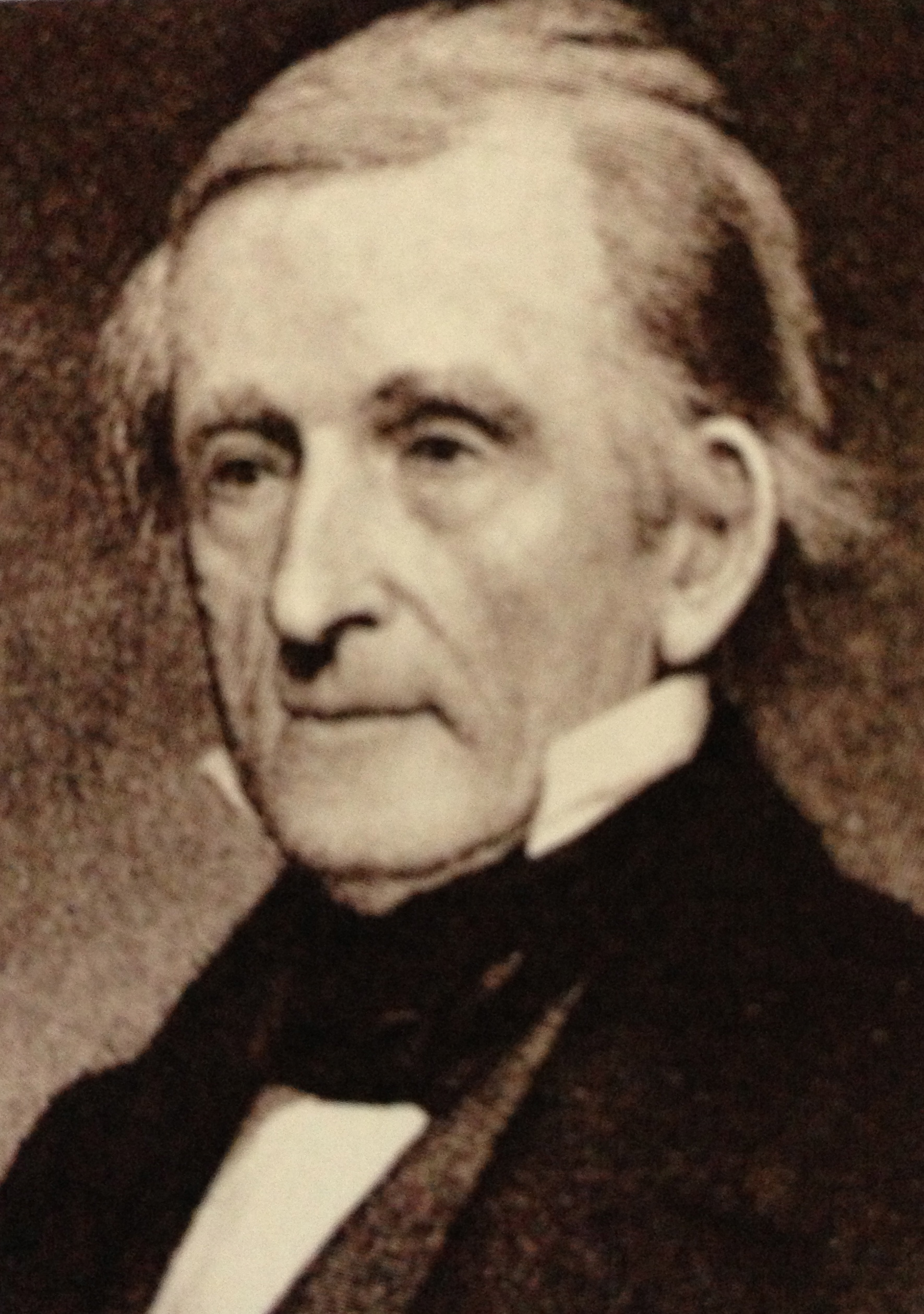

Member of the U.S. House of Representatives from Virginia
- In office March 4, 1819 – March 3, 1825
- Preceded by: William J. Lewis
- Succeeded by: Thomas Davenport
- Constituency: 15th district (1819–1823); 6th district (1823–1825)

Member of the Virginia House of Delegates from the Pittsylvania County district
- In office December 4, 1815 – December 1, 1817 Serving with Thomas Wooding
- Preceded by: William Walton
- Succeeded by: Walter Coles

Personal details
- Born: August 20, 1775 St. George's Island, Bermuda
- Died: April 10, 1861 (aged 85) Albemarle County, Virginia, U.S.
- Resting place: University of Virginia Cemetery, Charlottesville, Virginia, U.S.
- Party: Democratic-Republican
- Spouse(s): Mary Byrd Farley, Maria Carter Tucker, Louisa Thompson
- Education: College of William and Mary
- Profession: Author; professor; lawyer; politician
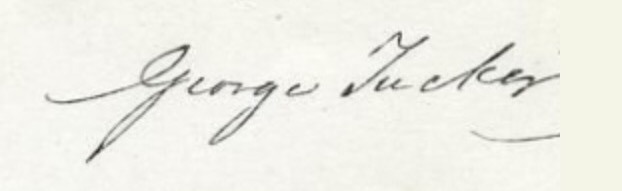
- Signature

George Tucker (August 20, 1775 – April 10, 1861) was an American writer, educator and historian in Virginia, following early years as an attorney and politician. His literary works include The Valley of Shenandoah (1824), the first fiction of colonial life in Virginia, and A Voyage to the Moon (1827), which is among the nation's earliest science fiction novels. He also published the first comprehensive biography of Thomas Jefferson in 1837, as well as his History of the United States (1856). Tucker's authorship, and his work as a teacher, served to redeem an earlier life of unprincipled habits which had brought him some disrepute.

Tucker was a son of the first mayor of Hamilton, Bermuda, Daniel Tucker. He immigrated to Virginia at age 20, was educated at the College of William and Mary, and was admitted to the bar. His first marriage to Mary Farley ended childless with her death in 1799; he remarried and had six children with wife Maria Carter, who died at age 38 in 1823. His third wife of 30 years was Louisa Thompson, who died in 1858.

Aside from his law practice, Tucker began to write compositions for various publications. His topics ranged widely from the conceptual to the technical from slavery, suffrage, and morality to intracoastal navigation, wages, and banking. He was elected in 1816 to the Virginia House of Delegates for one term, and served in the United States House of Representatives from 1819 to 1825. From his youth until early middle age, Tucker's lofty social lifestyle was often profligate, and occasionally scandalous. Nevertheless, upon completion of his congressional term, his eloquent publications led Thomas Jefferson and James Madison to offer him an appointment as Professor of Moral Philosophy at the newly founded University of Virginia; he accepted and held that post until 1845.

After retiring, Tucker relocated to Philadelphia, where he continued his research, and expounding upon a variety of subjects, including monetary policy and socioeconomics, until his death in Virginia at the age of 85.

== Early life and education ==
Tucker was born August 20, 1775, on St. George's Island, Bermuda. He was the second son of Daniel and Elizabeth Tucker, who were distant cousins, and members of the Tucker family that included Henry Tucker. Daniel and his brothers established a mercantile partnership with a fleet of vessels shipping goods to British America, Newfoundland, and the West Indies. Daniel was also a founder and mayor of the port of Hamilton, Bermuda. Tucker offers a description of his physique in his Autobiography: "I was 5 ft 10 in (178 cm) in height, and tho' somewhat slender, well proportioned. I had great animal spirits, and unceasing mobility. My face was somewhat of a feminine cast."

Tucker was educated primarily by a tutor engaged from Great Britain and also by Josiah Meigs. His assigned reading included Tom Jones, The Vicar of Wakefield, and Arabian Nights, among the mainstays of an education on the American continent. At age fifteen he helped form a literary club, which he says he named the Calliopean Society; this may have been an imitation of the original started earlier in New York. Tucker at age 16 began to read the law under a successful and prosperous lawyer, George Bascomb. At Bascomb's death, the firm's clients urged Tucker to assume their representation, but feeling quite unqualified, he declined, and initiated plans for a career in the United States.

According to Tucker's Autobiography, at this time he encountered his first love interest, in a distant cousin, Nancy Tucker. The longer he suffered in silence with his feelings, the stronger they grew, until finally he resolved to call upon her at home and make his declaration. Upon his arrival, the two entered a parlor where he offered her his hand, which was accepted, all in silence. The tongue-tied handholding continued for 10–15 minutes until interrupted by the entrance of her mother, and the visit ended. Very soon thereafter the girl fell ill and died and left Tucker in grief, which he described as a "most serious affliction." Six years passed before he expressed an interest in another woman.

== Immigration to the United States, education and first marriage ==
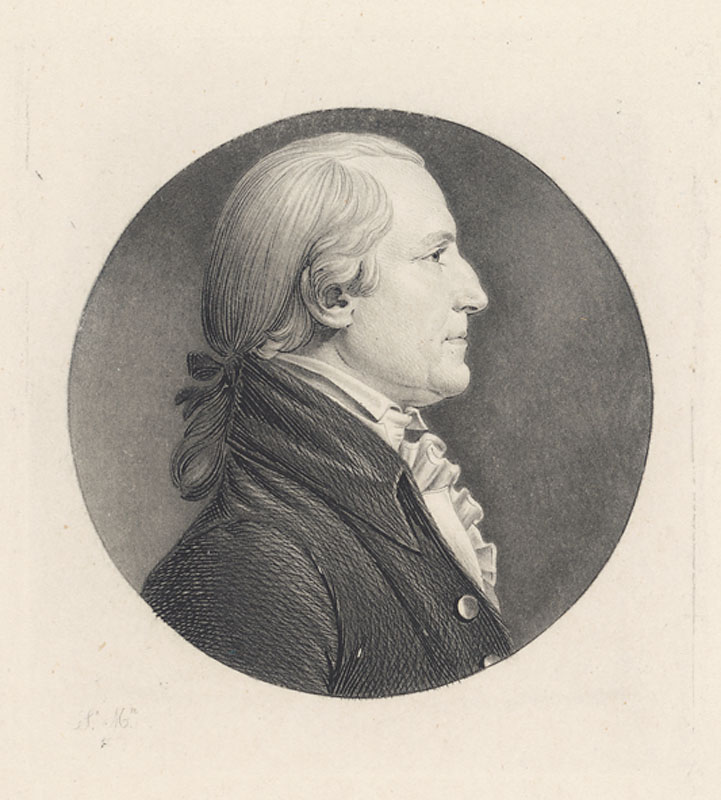
Saint-Mamin engraved portrait of Tucker's cousin, St. George Tucker, who provided pivotal help to Tucker

Shortly after his mother's death in 1795, Tucker sailed for Philadelphia, intending to continue his legal education in the United States. He briefly considered London for his studies but discarded the idea, in order to optimize his chances for "political advancement." After a free-spending time with other Bermudians in the capital city, he ran out of funds, and proceeded to Williamsburg, Virginia to seek advice and borrow money from his famous cousin St. George Tucker, a maneuver he would repeat. He was admitted to the College of William & Mary, where he studied law under St. George and graduated after two years. Tucker was pleased to find the academic work undemanding, and his social life entertaining, as he gained access to the finer homes through his cousin.

Tucker traveled to New York and Philadelphia and, with letters of introduction in hand, was able to further acquaint himself with his adopted country and noted leaders, including George Washington and New York governors John Jay and George Clinton. Despite his enjoyment of this high society, he returned to Williamsburg and there began a courtship with Mary Byrd Farley, who was possessed of much charm and fortune, and to whom he proposed. Though he had initially preferred to delay the wedding until he was admitted to the bar, he gave in to his heart's desire, borrowed the needed funds from an uncle, and they married in April 1797. To help Mary, who was chronically ill with consumption, Tucker arranged a trip to his old home in Bermuda. The stay there provided Mary no relief from her illness and confirmed their desire to be in Virginia. They returned to Williamsburg, setting up residence, and he began to read for admission to the bar, which was completed after some procrastination. Except for trips to North Carolina to collect rents on his wife's property, Tucker avoided work, attending horse races in Fredericksburg, and frequenting fashionable watering places with friends and family. He made Thomas Jefferson's acquaintance at this time. Mary never recovered from her infirmities, and died childless in 1799.

Mary's death complicated Tucker's facile life, as her estate, though considerable, was fraught with legal problems. It included a sugar plantation, thousands of acres of land, and a share in the Dismal Swamp Company. After a prolonged trip to the sugar plantation in Antigua, and on to Martinique and Bermuda, he returned to Williamsburg and then determined his future was in the nearby state capital of Richmond, Virginia as a practicing attorney. Tucker ultimately succeeded in salvaging only part of his late wife's fortune.

== Richmond society, second marriage, slavery and politics ==
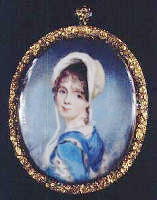
Maria Carter Tucker, miniature portrait by Sully ca. 1805

Tucker arrived in Richmond in the summer of 1800 with a letter of introduction from St. George to Governor James Monroe. His cousin's letter accurately portrayed Tucker's character and also foretold his future there: "To the best qualities of the heart he unites an excellent understanding, which has been well cultivated, and a very comprehensive knowledge of the world; nature has blessed him with a most exuberant flow of spirits, which sometimes betray him into acts of levity..." Tucker effectively entered the desired social circles in Richmond, bolstered by a well-furnished home near the Governor's own, and soon could count among his acquaintances not only the Governor (whom Tucker called "that slow dull man"), but also George Wythe, Edmund Pendleton, and George Hay. (Tucker later boasted that, with the exception of John Adams, he had conducted personal intercourse with every president from Washington to Buchanan.)

While in Richmond, he met Charles Carter (1765–1829), who introduced him to daughter Maria Ball Carter—a granddaughter of Elizabeth Washington Lewis and descendant of Robert Carter I. Tucker described her as, "being a decided beauty, she had a face distinguished for sweetness and intelligence, conversed sensibly and sang sweetly." They soon fell in love, and in February 1802 he married Maria, age seventeen and pregnant.

While Tucker began writing for publication, as an attorney he was initially deficient, being disabled by his fear of speaking in the courtroom; he later gained the requisite self-confidence. Tucker later became a founding member of the Virginia Historical and Philosophical Society (now the Virginia Museum of History and Culture) in Richmond. This was an effort led by John Marshall and John Floyd; Tucker was named to the Society's Standing Committee.

Politically, Tucker was a Jeffersonian Republican, who delighted at the split in the Federalists between John Adams and Alexander Hamilton. He joined in the resentment toward Federalist attempts to "appoint a president" by party caucus; in time he became a pro-bank Republican. He once gave a speech in support of a Federalist in a local election, and a staunch Republican, Lewis Harvey, called him a party traitor and liar. In reaction Tucker, routinely prone to a hot temper, took a swing at Harvey, but missed due to the intervention of a neutral party. Assuming his challenge unsuccessful, Tucker demanded satisfaction, which Harvey accepted. Tucker carefully arranged the duel, stipulating an extraordinary distance in paces, so as to diminish the superior marksmanship of his opponent. Fortunately for Tucker the duel was avoided at the last moment—though not before he had completed his will and arranged his estate for his expecting wife. Their first child, Daniel George, was born November 23, 1802.

=== Positions on slavery ===
Tucker sought out the foremost authors in Richmond to advance his interest in literature and the arts. A conspiracy of slaves initiated a futile attempt to destroy the city, and he was prompted to publish an essay suggesting a remedy to slavery, entitled Letter to a Member of the General Assembly of Virginia (1801). Tucker's Letter expressed his early opposition to slavery, portraying it as unproductive and uneconomical. He wrote that no country "can attain great heights in manufactures, commerce or agriculture where one half of the community labours unwillingly, and the other half does not labour at all." He recommended that revenues be secured (with a tax on slaveholders) and used to establish a colony for the slaves west of the Mississippi. He further asserted that the slave's inferiority was a result of time and circumstance, and not heredity.

In the 1820s, however, Tucker's views of slavery changed notably with personal experience, and profit, realized in his purchase and sale of slaves for his account and that of his father-in-law, Charles Carter. For years, he opposed the concepts of abolition and colonization as impractical, but he later reverted to his earlier conclusion that a more beneficial, commercially oriented, society was inevitable. While noting the spurious benefits of slavery, he predicted its eventual demise; he ultimately freed his own slaves in 1845, 16 years before his death.

== Scandal, rustic life and valor ==
=== Dissipation and rigged lottery ===
Tucker's law practice could not support the expenses essential to his extravagant social exploits, which included gambling at cards and races, and he proceeded to waste the capital from Mary Tucker's estate. He was drawn to speculative investments and ultimately was embroiled in a financial scandal. In 1803, he joined other prominent citizens in organizing a lottery to raise funds for the Richmond Academy. He bought several chances for himself and, as remaining chances dwindled, resold some of them for a profit; he also was said to have positioned himself as one of four or five holders sure to be a winner. He held the winning stub when his ticket was found lodged in a joint of the drawing drum.

Tucker was asked for reimbursement, and after negotiation, paid it in part, borrowing the remainder from members of the academy board. He also acted as custodian of other funds, blended them with his own and spent it on overindulgence and land speculation. Later he was required to defend himself in these matters before the Virginia General Assembly. Though he was officially cleared of wrongdoing, the incidents tarnished his reputation and highlighted the style of his living in Richmond. Meanwhile, Maria gave birth to their eldest daughter, Eleanor Rosalie, on May 4, 1804.

Tucker in his Autobiography confessed to frequently misplacing his pocketbook over the years, and estimated his loss in the aggregate to be more than a thousand dollars in cash (the equivalent of $26,000 in 2020). To this he added, "This heedlessness I had from a child, and during my practice of the law, I strewed the upper country as well with countless umbrellas, gloves, watches, cufflinks, handkerchiefs, and knives."

=== Rural settings ===
In 1806, Tucker relocated his family, including newborn daughter Maria, to the Carters' home in Frederick County, Virginia, and attempted to put his financial house in order. Business required his frequent return to Richmond, and on one occasion he was arrested there for a delinquency owed to a loan company. The immediate problem was solved with the intervention of St. George. Tucker economized for two years, living a rural life with the Carters and other family members and was able to purchase a home near the Dan River. In May 1808, the family moved to "Woodbridge" in Pittsylvania County, where daughter Eliza Lewis Carter was born in December. Maria was then faced with rearing four children in more rural, less favorable living conditions. For his part, Tucker was disappointed with the local social life. While he thought all his neighbors "friendly and civil," they were also "unpolished and plain." Tucker put greater effort into his law practice and became more successful, acquiring additional clients spread across four counties. He was also elected Commonwealth's Attorney for Pittsylvania County. Maria gave birth to daughter Lelia in October 1810 and Harriett in May 1813.

=== Self-described act of chivalry ===
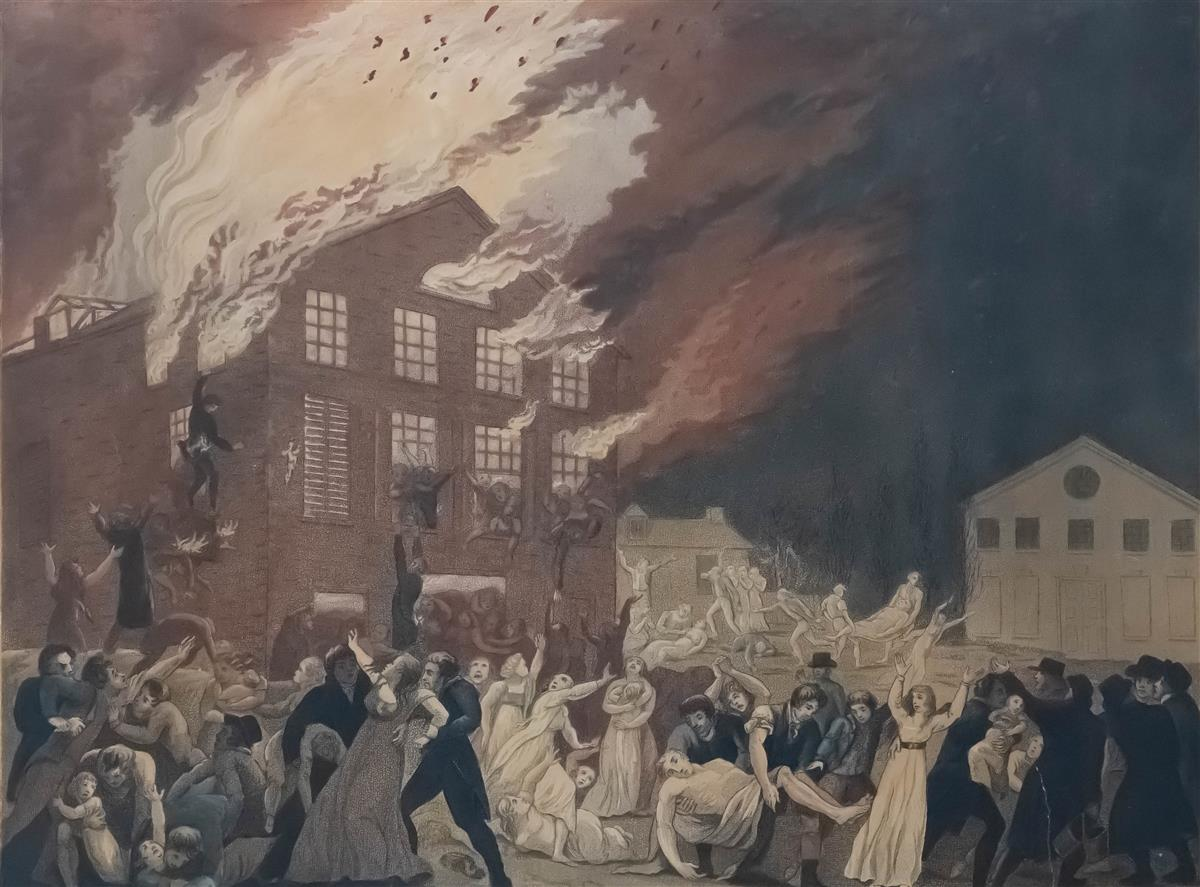
1811 Richmond Theater fire – Tucker said he left early but re-entered to save others

In 1811, Tucker was in Richmond to attend a benefit performance, and put his life in danger during the infamous Richmond Theatre fire. The event, including a play entitled The Father, or Family Feuds and a pantomime afterwards named Raymond and Agnes, was held in December at the Richmond Theatre. It being Christmas time, the auditorium was packed—with 518 adults and 80 children. In his Autobiography Tucker relates that, "The play was over... and there appearing to be much delay in bringing on the afterpiece... I had fortunately quitted the [play]house while it was on fire, tho' I did not know the fact... but the cry of fire prevented my reaching my lodgings, and hurried me back to witness a spectacle of human woe which I have never seen equalled. I was instrumental in saving several females from the flames." In the process, Tucker suffered a head injury when struck by a falling timber, and was left with a permanent scar above his eye. The tragedy took the lives of 72 people, including the sitting Governor of Virginia, George William Smith. Victims also included many of the upper echelons in Richmond society.

== Elective office and early writing ==
Tucker's maritime roots in Bermuda instilled an interest in intracoastal navigation, and he began an intense campaign with the legislatures of North Carolina and Virginia to improve the waterways to Norfolk along the Roanoke, Dan, and Staunton Rivers, in order to avoid inefficient portage required to Petersburg and Richmond. This effort culminated in his own bids for election to a seat in the Virginia House of Delegates representing Pittsylvania County, which failed in 1813 and 1814 but then succeeded in 1816. It was at this time that Tucker and Maria suffered the first loss of a child, Harriett, from whooping cough at age three.

In the House of Delegates Tucker's most valued contributions were made in writing rather than speaking. He was asked to draft a valedictory address in tribute to James Madison, whose administration was then drawing to a close. It was well received, except for the critique of fellow delegate Philip Doddridge who regretted that a "foreigner" should be assigned the task. Tucker took strong exception to the insult. Nevertheless, when he was offered a cane with which to attack Doddridge, though tempted, he thought better of it.

Tucker continued his work in literature along with his law practice, and in 1814–1815 the Philadelphia Port Folio published a series of his essays entitled Thoughts of a Hermit. Financial success was for once his as a result of these endeavors. He also realized profits from land sales near the Dan River, and the sale of Woodbridge when the family moved again, to Lynchburg, Virginia in 1818.

The death of daughter Harriett had been painful enough, but Maria's depression became uncontrollable and chronic when daughter Rosalie died unexpectedly at age 14 in 1818. Also during this period Maria's father, Charles Carter, encountered his own financial setbacks, and prevailed upon Tucker for assistance. Tucker, with the help of Lawrence Lewis, was able to settle the Carters at "Deerwood", sharing part of the profits from Charles' management there.

With financial success came more clients and opportunities to serve his community. Tucker received many cases in debt collection, and he was appointed trustee of the Lynchburg Female Academy and vestryman at St. Paul's Episcopal Church. He was also elected to serve in the United States House of Representatives from 1819 to 1825, representing the Lynchburg area in the 16th, 17th, and 18th United States Congresses. His financial largess was short-lived, as Tucker was unable to resist the allure of society and lavish living in Washington, not to mention the increased expenses of a larger immediate family.

Though Tucker and Maria were warned against her having more children in her vulnerable physical and emotional state, she again conceived, and died in pregnancy in February 1823. In the carriage to Washington after the funeral, Tucker muffled his face with a handkerchief to hide his tears and feigned a toothache in response to inquirers. Maria's death indeed weighed heavily upon him, as he reflected on his plausible neglect in the midst of her travails. He also was much concerned for his son Daniel's indolence and unbalanced behavior, which years later resulted in the son's hospitalization and ultimate death in 1838 in Philadelphia.

Due in part to these personal trials, he made no momentous contributions to Congress beyond his reliable positions representing Virginia's interests, with a consistent Jeffersonian Republican voting record. He did serve as chairman of the Committee on Expenditures in the Department of War. There are notable disparities between Tucker's more statist voting record and the nationalism predominant in his writings during this period and later. In his essay On Instructions to Representatives, he provides an explanation in political theory—an inevitable obligation to think one way and yet vote another, in compliance with constituent preferences.

Tucker's self-assessment as a congressman is otherwise much less forgiving: "In addition to the pecuniary engagements and difficulties which unfitted my mind for the current business of legislation, I spent all my leisure hours playing chess, to which I was shamefully and regretfully, but passionately devoted. I had then a livelier ambition to be a great chess player than to be a distinguished member of Congress."

== Academics ==
Near the end of Tucker's third congressional term in 1824, Thomas Jefferson presented him with an offer on behalf of the fledgling University of Virginia, sanctioned by Trustees James Madison and Joseph C. Cabell, to serve as the first Professor of Moral Philosophy. The offer met the school's desire to appoint a non-Federalist to the post, and Tucker's connections with Cabell and St. George would also have facilitated his selection. Another factor was Tucker's recent 1822 Essays on Various Subjects of Taste, Morals, and National Policy, which included papers from the Port Folio. Madison had been provided a copy of these and recommended them to Jefferson, saying they were "among the best answers to the charges of our national ...backwardness." Tucker's selection may also have been an accommodation to some of the school's opponents, including Episcopalians, Federalists, and notable western Virginians, many of whom were friends of Tucker's. Presumably, his prior monetary indiscretions were overlooked since no related formal charges were extant.

From Tucker's perspective, the offer was most opportune, as he considered his congressional seat in jeopardy, as well as his pocketbook. The professorship included a steady income, extra fees from philosophy students, tenure, and rent-free quarters on the University Lawn in Pavilion IX. Tucker accepted the offer, effective in 1825, and also was chosen the first chairman of the faculty. As well as his primary discipline, he also assumed charge of the subjects of Political Economics and Rhetoric for the university.

He was content with an expanding family life in Charlottesville, Virginia, as daughter Eliza married a fellow professor, Gessner Harrison of the Harrison family of Virginia; they eventually produced ten grandchildren for Tucker. He nevertheless "found solitude unbearable" after Maria's death and began an earnest search for a wife, whom he found in Louisa A. Thompson, a widow from Baltimore. In their thirty years together Tucker later said he had found "the same warmth and devoted affection with which I have been previously blest."

Tucker's primary philosophical interest was what he and his contemporaries called "mental philosophy," which involved the investigation of the principles and faculties of the human mind. He maintained that modern philosophers had acquired the discipline to free themselves from medieval "mysticism and folly," in the same manner that modern chemists cast aside alchemy.

Tucker's effectiveness in the lecture hall is not objectively certain, and he may well have encountered difficulty with public speaking as he had in the courtroom previously. His continued faculty chairmanship certainly testified to his relative popularity among colleagues, and he published numerous works—including one satire, a fiction, three books on economics and statistics, a Jefferson biography, as well as two pamphlets. Together with Robley Dunglison he founded and edited the Virginia Literary Museum (1829–1830) in which he published voluminous writings, and he frequently sent essays to newspapers and other magazines.

== Later politics and major literary works ==
=== Politics ===
Some of Tucker's writing reflected a growing political skepticism of the workings of democracy beginning with the 1796 election. By the late 1820s, he was persuaded that political leadership positions should be reserved primarily for prosperous people with a tangible, and taxable, interest in government. Andrew Jackson's election in 1828 was for Tucker an example of the "triumph of democratic demagoguery which could bring about class warfare." Tucker worked arduously in Virginia to oppose Jackson and was a solid supporter of Henry Clay, with his second choice being Daniel Webster.

He opposed universal suffrage, and favored limiting the franchise to half of free men, and allowing slaveholders to cast votes on behalf of three-fifths of their slaves; he also argued in favor of eliminating the secret ballot. Tucker also promoted the Second National Bank and strongly criticized Jackson for defunding it.

=== Works of fiction ===
Tucker's premier literary work was The Valley of Shenandoah (1824), the first fictional tale of life in Virginia. His writing began on July 1 and the book was completed by August 31. In relating the downfall of an aristocratic family in the commonwealth's valley, it drew upon his personal witness of the financial ruin of his in-laws, the family of Charles Carter, and described the inability of an estate owner to manage his monetary affairs, such as he had personally experienced. Tucker further used the novel's characters, again reflecting personal experience, to emphasize that happiness in love and life resulted from the moderation of one's passions. The Valley stressed Tucker's professorial objective, that history must inform the reader with "the progress of society and the arts of civilization; with the advancement and decline of literature, laws, manners and commerce." He also conveyed through the fiction his view that gentility was independent of wealth, that the relationship between masters and slaves was imbued with mutual trust and happiness, and that the strong currents of socio-economic change were on the whole beneficent.

In his negotiations with the publisher Harpers, Tucker relates: "As an excuse for not offering me more liberal terms, one of them, the eldest partner, said, 'Why, we shall have to give a man fifty dollars to read your book. 'Oh,' said I, 'what chance have you then to sell it if you have to hire a man to read it?'" Harpers offered to pay him $500, which he declined, and the publication was delayed at an unknown price.

Using the pseudonym Joseph Atterley, in 1827 he wrote the satire A Voyage to the Moon: With Some Account of the Manners and Customs, Science and Philosophy, of the People of Morosofia, and Other Lunarians. It is one of the earliest American works of science fiction, and was relatively successful, earning Tucker $100 from the sale of 1000 copies. It received positive reviews from the American Quarterly Review and the Western Monthly Review. Tucker uses The Voyage to ridicule the social manners, religion and professions of some of his colleagues, and to criticize some erroneous scientific methods and results apparent to him at the time.

=== First biography of Jefferson ===
In 1836, Tucker completed his manuscript of a comprehensive biography, The Life of Thomas Jefferson, Third President of the United States. He sent his composition to James Madison for his approval, as the latter had assisted in its formation. Tucker included for his sanction a proposed dedication to the recipient. Madison replied with his full approbation and signature on June 26, 1836, just hours before his death the following day.

This study of the life of Jefferson was published in two volumes the following year, and received complimentary assessment in the Edinburgh Review from Lord Brougham, as "a very valuable addition to the stock of our political and historical knowledge. In it, Professor Tucker does not always accord with the illustrious subject of his biography. The work, indeed, manifests a laudable desire to do justice, and to decide impartially on contested topics; and hence, perhaps, it failed to give satisfaction to the ardent supporters, as well as to the bitter opponents, of Mr. Jefferson." Tucker gave the publication a positive assessment, saying he was paid 50 cents per copy upon an initial printing of 2000 copies.

== Sabbatical abroad, retirement, and work of U.S. history ==
=== Sojourn in Great Britain ===
Tucker considered a trip abroad would enhance his insight and résumé generally, and specifically prepare him for a possible, though not likely, diplomatic appointment. He expected there was much to be learned for his country's benefit in the British factories, great estates, and crowded cities. With his finances in order and a three-month leave from the university, in 1839 he made a trip to Great Britain and after some time in Shakespeare country, Stratford-Upon-Avon, he settled in Liverpool. He did not succeed in making all the expected social connections, with the exception of the 1st Earl of Leicester and his wife, with whom he frequently discussed politics and agriculture. Though admiring the succinct debates in Parliament, he found Queen Victoria's procession "more fit to amuse a child than one of my age." On the whole he found conversation did not come easily with the British, and concluded that "...there were more churls in England than in all of Europe besides." This journey, along with his interest in the doctrines of Thomas Robert Malthus on populace, inspired Tucker to expound upon the mixed blessings of a prospective urbanized world. Some of his hypotheses were included in The Progress of the United States in Population and Wealth (Boston, 1843). This work gained him one of his proudest honors, a membership in the Statistical Society of Paris.

His enthusiasm for teaching at the university ebbed in his final years there. He was also perturbed by an increase in religious enthusiasm on campus and a temperance movement, which he mildly protested. Tucker zealously defended higher salaries for more tenured professors, and he was enraged when the university reduced his annual salary from $1500 to $1000. Having produced documentation proving that Jefferson had intended his salary be guaranteed for life, he convinced the university to reinstate his original salary.

=== Resignation from faculty and relocation ===
With the resignation of Henry St. George Tucker, Tucker's last contemporary on the faculty, Tucker in 1845 resigned his own professorship and moved with his wife to Philadelphia. There he enjoyed a reunion with his friend Robley Dunglison, and the availability of more libraries, and meetings at the American Philosophical Society to which he was elected in 1837. Nevertheless, there were drawbacks—for one, the lack of accommodation that slaveholding had brought him—he had emancipated all five of his slaves upon his departure from Charlottesville. He later expressed doubt about the wisdom of this decision when he learned that three of them had, by law, been exiled from Virginia, and shortly thereafter died. As well, the two freed slaves who accompanied him to Philadelphia immediately deserted their posts upon arrival there.

Social life in the urban setting did not initially live up to his expectations, but after a time his writing and lecturing upon a variety of subjects filled the void. He also joined The American Institute for the Advancement of Science and successfully urged its members to establish a section on Political Economics and Statistics. He as well engaged in a debate, as antagonist of Malthusian population theory with proponent Alexander Hill Everett.

=== History of the United States ===
In 1856, Tucker completed his four-volume History of the United States, From Their Colonization to the End of the 26th Congress in 1841. Tucker had sprightly begun his work on this production in 1850, at the age of 75. Robley Dunglison commented as follows on the work: "To aid him in the execution of his work, as [Tucker] himself remarks, it had been his good fortune to have a personal knowledge of many, who bore a conspicuous part in the Revolution, and of nearly all those who were the principal actors in the political dramas which succeeded. The history extends to the elevation of General William Henry Harrison to the Presidency in 1841, which is as far as Tucker thought he could prudently go." The work includes a brief review of slavery, in which Tucker took issue with Jefferson's decades-old view in his Notes on the State of Virginia (1781), that slavery still had a degenerative effect upon slaveholders.

According to Tucker, previews of the work by his colleagues brought commendation, the reception of the publisher was encouraging, and payment advances were arranged with a bank. Then came the bank failures and loss of credit from the Panic of 1857, and printing was halted. Tucker's final comment on the situation was an optimistic one, for the future of the economy and for his authorship.

== Final years ==
Though Tucker may have displayed in his old age "a spirit of pugnacity becoming earlier years," as one critic claimed, such a nature was not in evidence with his family. He corresponded positively and frequently with his children and vacationed with them in the summers in Virginia and New York. He appears to have been consistent in his devotion to his family, which was returned by them in kind. His exchanges with them were replete with a concern for their financial well-being. Musing on his own past errors, he told them that "except for the loss of friends, a want of prudence in money matters has contributed nine-tenths of the pain and vexation of [my] life."

Even after the death of his wife Louisa in 1858, Tucker's vitality persisted and, not long before the American Civil War began, in January 1861 he journeyed south through Virginia, the Carolinas and Georgia to Alabama to visit a friend in Mobile. In reaction to Georgia's secession from the union, speaking from his lingering southern loyalty, he commented, "it seems a poor remedy for an unpopular President." He thought the overriding need for "a wise provident government" would bring the southern states back under a modified constitution. But after some time spent in the south, he was compelled to say the people "seemed to be crazed in the fancies of imaginary evils and their strange remedies." Indeed, Tucker's youthful loyalties to the agrarian south had in his maturity given way to a belief in the value and necessity of a commercial-industrial society. Nationalism had replaced statism as the foundation of his politics, and he could not understand why a compromise in lieu of war would not be embraced.

Tucker concluded his literary career, at age 84, with his 226-page book, Political Economy for the People (1859).

Tucker sustained head injuries at Mobile Bay when, awaiting his ship's departure for return to the north, he was struck by a large bale of cotton being loaded on board. He was moved to the home of daughter Eleanor and husband George Rives in Albemarle County, Virginia, where he died on April 10, 1861, two days prior to the Battle of Fort Sumter and the beginning of the American Civil War. He was buried at the University of Virginia Cemetery.

== Works ==
- Letters on the Conspiracy of Slaves in Virginia (Richmond, 1800)
- Letters on the Roanoke Navigation (1811)
- Recollections of Eleanor Rosalie Tucker (Lynchburg, 1819)
- Essays on Subjects of Taste, Morals, and National Policy, under the pen-name "A Citizen of Virginia" (Georgetown, 1822)
- Tucker, George (1824). The Valley of Shenandoah; or, Memoirs of the Graysons. With an introd. by Donald R. Noble, Jr (1970 Reprint of the 1824 ed.). Chapel Hill: University of North Carolina Press. ISBN 0-8078-4055-6. LCCN 70123106. This was reprinted in England and translated into German.
- Tucker, George (1827). A Voyage to the Moon. New York: E. Bliss. LCCN 03002392.
- Principles of Rent, Wages, and Profits (Philadelphia, 1837)
- Public Discourse on the Literature of the United States (Charlottesville, 1837)
- Tucker, George (1837). The Life of Thomas Jefferson, Third President of the United States. Philadelphia: Carey, Lea & Blanchard.
- The Theory of Money and Banks Investigated (Boston, 1839)
- Essay on Cause and Effect (Philadelphia, 1842)
- Essay on the Association of Ideas (1843)
- Progress of the United States in Population and Wealth in Fifty Years (New York, 1843)
- Memoir of the Life and Character of Dr. John P. Emmet (Philadelphia, 1845)
- Correspondence with Alexander H. Everett on Political Economy (1845)
- Tucker, George (1856). The History of the United States. Philadelphia: J. B. Lippincott & Co. LCCN 02002948.
- Banks or No Banks (New York, 1857)
- Tucker, George (1859). Political Economy for the People. Philadelphia: C. Sherman & Son. LCCN 05021928.
- Essays, Moral and Philosophical (1860)
- Tucker, George (1977). Noble, Donald R. (ed.). A Century Hence: or, A Romance of 1941. Charlottesville: University of Virginia Press. LCCN 76041223.

== See also ==
- American literature
- Bibliography of Thomas Jefferson
- List of historians
- Southern literature
- Henry Tucker (President of the Council of Bermuda)

U.S. House of Representatives
Preceded by William J. Lewis	Member of the U.S. House of Representatives from Virginia's 15th congressional district 1817–1823	Succeeded by John S. Barbour
Preceded by Alexander Smyth	Member of the U.S. House of Representatives from Virginia's 6th congressional district 1823–1825	Succeeded by Thomas Davenport
