= J. O. Bailey =

American literary theorist

James Osler Bailey (August 12, 1903 – 1979) was a professor of literature who taught at the University of North Carolina at Chapel Hill. He wrote on a wide slate of topics ranging from the works of Edgar Allan Poe and Thomas Hardy to science fiction and utopian literature.

Bailey was born at Raleigh, North Carolina, to Thomas Benjamin Bailey, a city employee, and Nancy Priscilla (née Smith). He was educated at the University of North Carolina (A.B. 1924, M.A. 1927, Ph.D 1934) and taught English there from 1930.

The Science Fiction Research Association gives recognition in the form of the Pilgrim Award in honor of his seminal work Pilgrims Through Space and Time. Reviewer Willy Ley, however, found the volume disappointing; while praising the core of the work, the master's thesis and doctoral dissertation written by Bailey years earlier, he faulted the remainder of the book as inferior, "obviously pasted to the original dissertation both loosely and clumsily."

He was struck by a car and died later from a blood clot, in 1979.

== Books ==
- Supplementary Exercises for Use in English Courses for Engineers: Prepared to Accompany Howell's Handbook of English in Engineering Usage with Cross References to Woolley and Scott's College Handbook of Composition and Greever and Jones' The Century Collection, Chapman & Hall, (1931)
- Poe's "Stonehenge", University Press, (1941)
- Sources for Poe's Arthur Gordon Pym, "Hans Pfaal," and Other Pieces, Modern Language Association of America, (1942)
- Hardy's "Imbedded Fossil", North Carolina University, (1945)
- Pilgrims Through Space and Time: Trends and Patterns in Scientific and Utopian Fiction, (1947)
- The Southern Humanities Conference and Its Constituent Societies, University of North Carolina Press, (1951)
- Proper Words in Proper Places, (1952)
- Victorian Poetry, by Edward K. Brown & J. O. Bailey, Ronald Press, (1962)
- British Plays of the Nineteenth Century: An Anthology to Illustrate the Evolution of the Drama, ed. by J. O. Bailey, (1966)
- The Poetry of Thomas Hardy: A Handbook and Commentary, Chapel Hill, NC: University of North Carolina Press, (1970)
- Pilgrims Through Space and Time: Trends in Scientific and Utopian Fiction, with a foreword by Thomas D. Clareson, Westport, CT: Greenwood Press, (1972)
- Thomas Hardy and His Cosmic Mind: A New Reading of the Dynasts, Westport, CT: Greenwood Press, (1977)
- Symzonia: A Voyage of Discovery, by Adam Seaborn, a facsimile reproduction with an introduction by J. O. Bailey, n.d.

== Library collections ==
He donated his correspondence with playwright Eugene O'Neill to The Museum of the City of New York. His correspondence with publisher William Terry Crouch and playwright Paul Green are at the University of North Carolina at Chapel Hill library.
