= Green children (disambiguation) =

Green children of Woolpit is a folkloric story from England.

Green child or green children may also refer to:

- The Green Child, a novel by Herbert Read, based upon the English story
- The Green Children, a European musical duo
