= Cheryl Bogart =

American music industry executive

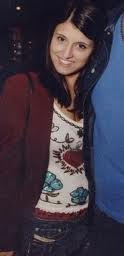
- Bogart in 2003
- Born: Cheryl Lynn Costanzo; November 27, 1977 (age 48); Oak Park, Illinois, U.S.
- Occupations: Record executive Music manager Disability rights advocate

Cheryl Bogart (born November 27, 1977) is an American music industry veteran.

== Personal life ==
Bogart was born in the Chicago suburb of Oak Park, Illinois, and is of Russian, Polish and Italian descent. She spent her early life in Beverly Hills, California, and graduated from Good Shepherd Catholic School, followed by Beverly Hills High School. Her higher learning continued at Wilbur Wright College and Santa Monica City College. In her 20s she became business partners and married music executive and songwriter Evan Bogart. In October 2005, Bogart sustained an incomplete spinal cord injury as a result of a fall.

== Family ==
Bogart's brother, Phillip Scheid VI, was injured in a 1999 shooting by his childhood best friend, Scott Sterling, son of real estate mogul and former Los Angeles Clippers basketball team owner Donald Sterling. Reportedly the incident occurred after an argument between the two regarding actress Lindsey McKeon.

== Career ==
Bogart's career in the entertainment world began in her late teens, when she started scouting models, musicians and actors for No Limit Records. She was mentored by Elliot Roberts at Lookout Management, then went on to work for numerous record and management companies in Los Angeles and New York.

In 2002, Bogart helped then-business partner and husband, Evan Bogart, form Casbah Artists Management in tribute to Evan's deceased father and Casablanca Records founder, Neil Bogart.

Bogart went on to form her own management company, Spider Artists Management where she managed Casey Johnson, and, among others, Richard Grieco's band, Wasteland Park. In 2009, she signed The Green Children, a duo from the United Kingdom and Norway, to a two-album deal under her management company. During that same year, she took on the role as senior executive for Knightingale Entertainment, which is owned by The Green Children. Bogart secured a worldwide distribution deal for the group through Spinside Records, a subsidiary of Inside Recordings, which is owned by the legendary Jackson Browne. Bogart and The Green Children parted ways in 2011.

In addition to her work with Spider Artists Management, Bogart began writing a book in 2010 about the dark underbelly of Beverly Hills, including details of her association with real estate mogul and former L.A. Clippers basketball team owner Donald Sterling.
