= Connection (The Green Children album) =

Studio album by The Green Children
- Released: 2013
- Recorded: 2013
- Genre: Electropop

The Green Children chronology
Encounter Remixed (2010)	Connection (2013)

Connection (2013) is the second studio album by European musical duo The Green Children. As with their previous album, a percentage of the proceeds were donated to The Green Children Foundation, their charity, which benefits orphaned children and animals in need. Supporters who pre-ordered the album received an autographed copy. This album also marks the first time Milla Sunde recorded a song in her native Norwegian tongue.

== Track listing ==
1. "Feel the Light"
2. "Possessed"
3. "Kisses from the Sky"
4. "Sailor"
5. "Connection"
6. "We Can Love Again"
7. "Unwanted Garden"
8. "Outline"
9. "I Can Do Anything"
10. "Norwegian Dream"

== Personnel ==
- Milla Sunde
- Marlow Bevan
