= Woolpit =

Village in Suffolk, England

Coordinates: 52°13′28″N 0°53′19″E

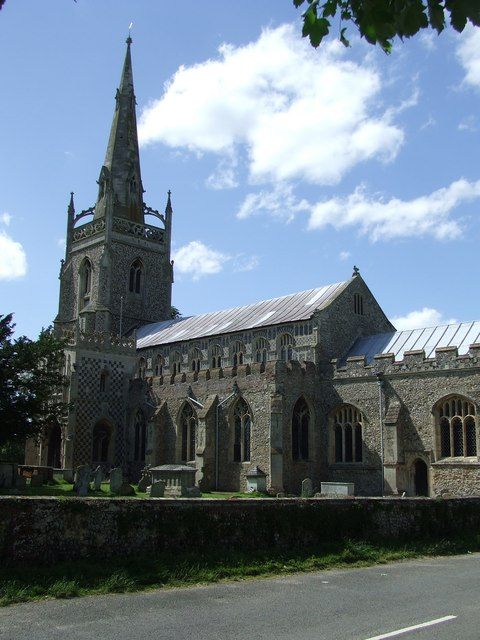
- Church of St Mary

- Location within Suffolk
- OS grid reference: TL973624
- District: Mid Suffolk
- Shire county: Suffolk
- Region: East
- Country: England
- Sovereign state: United Kingdom
- Post town: BURY ST. EDMUNDS
- Postcode district: IP30
- Dialling code: 01359

Woolpit (/ˈwʊlpɪt/ WUUL-pit) is a village in the English county of Suffolk, midway between the towns of Bury St. Edmunds and Stowmarket. In 2011 Woolpit parish had a population of 1,995. It is notable for the 12th-century legend of the green children of Woolpit and for its parish church, which has especially fine medieval woodwork. Administratively Woolpit is a civil parish, part of the district of Mid Suffolk.

== History ==
The village's name, first recorded in the 10th century as Wlpit and later as Wlfpeta, derives from the Old English wulf-pytt, meaning "pit for trapping wolves".

Before the Norman Conquest of England, the village belonged to Ulfcytel Snillingr. Between 1174 and 1180, Walter de Coutances, a confidant of King Henry II, was appointed to Woolpit. After his "death or retirement" it was to be granted to the monks of Bury St Edmunds Abbey. A bull of Pope Alexander III likewise confirms that revenues from Woolpit are to be given to the abbey.

In the 15th century and for some time afterwards, two fairs were held annually. The Horse Fair was held on two closes, or fields, on 16 September. The Cow Fair was held on its own field on 19 September; here toys, as well as cattle, were sold.

Sir Robert Gardiner, Lord Chief Justice of Ireland, was Lord of the Manor from 1597 to 1620. He founded an almshouse for the care of the poor women of Woolpit and nearby Elmswell. The Gardiner charity still exists. Woolpit passed at his death to his grandnephew, Gardiner Webb, who died in 1674.

From the 17th century, the area became an important manufacturing centre for "Suffolk White" bricks, but today only the pits remain.

Woolpit is in the hundred of Thedwestry, 8 miles (13 km) southeast of Bury. The area of the parish is 2,010 acres (8.1 km^{2}); the population in 1831 was 880, less than half agricultural.

Mill Lane marks the site of a post mill which was demolished in about 1924. Another mill, which fell down in 1963, stood in Windmill Avenue.

The village contains one pub, The Bull, two tea rooms, estate agents, a grocers, hairdressers, a fish and chip shop, Palmers Bakery, a dentist and Woolpit Interiors within the village and two industrial estates containing more larger businesses as well as a health surgery and school.

== Demographics ==
In 1811, Woolpit had 625 inhabitants in 108 houses. By 1821 the population had increased to 801 inhabitants in 116 houses.

== Legend of the green children ==
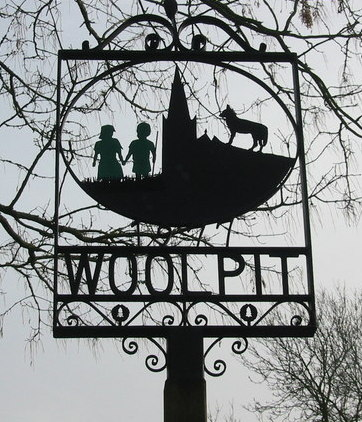
Village sign depicting the two green children, erected in 1977

The medieval writers Ralph of Coggeshall and William of Newburgh report that two children appeared mysteriously in Woolpit sometime during the 12th century. The brother and sister were of generally normal appearance except for the green colour of their skin. They wore strange-looking clothes, spoke in an unknown language, and the only food they would eat was raw beans. Eventually, they learned to eat other food and lost their green pallor, but the boy was sickly and died soon after the children were baptised. The girl adjusted to her new life, but she was considered to be "rather loose and wanton in her conduct". After learning to speak English she explained that she and her brother had come from St Martin's Land, an underground world whose inhabitants are green.

Some researchers believe that the story of the green children is a typical folk tale, describing an imaginary encounter with the inhabitants of another world, perhaps one beneath our feet or even extraterrestrial. Others consider it to be a garbled account of a historical event, perhaps connected with the persecution of Flemish immigrants living in the area at that time.

Local author and folk singer Bob Roberts stated in his 1978 book A Slice of Suffolk that, "I was told there are still people in Woolpit who are 'descended from the green children', but nobody would tell me who they were!"

== St Mary's Church ==
St Mary's Church is in the Deanery of Lavenham, in the Diocese of St Edmundsbury and Ipswich. It is combined with neighbouring Drinkstone as the "Benefice of Woolpit (Blessed Virgin Mary) with Drinkstone". The church had a statue to Saint Mary and an associated well.

== Woolpit bricks ==
Records of brick production in Woolpit date back to the 16th century, when Edward Duger and Richard Reynolds both had "brick-kells" (kell being a local word for a kiln). The bricks were very white and Frederic Shoberl suggested they were "equal in beauty to stone". In 1818 he remarked that most of the mansions in Suffolk were built from these bricks.

== Notable residents ==
- Dr Helen Geake – archaeologist and a member of Channel 4's Time Team.
- Ian Lavender – actor and cast member of Dad's Army.
