= Knightingale Entertainment =

Knightingale Entertainment was an Independent Record Company based in Los Angeles. The label's most prominent artist was The Green Children, a European duo who write and produce atmospheric electro-pop.

In December 2006, Knightingale and The Green Children released a fundraising CD/DVD entitled Hear Me Now throughout Norway. Through sales and donations from around the world they raised $400,000 for one of the first eye hospitals in rural Bangladesh. The hospital was opened on May 12, 2008 by The Green Children and Prof. Muhammad Yunus, the 2006 Nobel Peace Prize winner.

Knightingale had a worldwide distribution deal with Spinside Records, a subsidiary of Inside Recordings, owned by legendary musician Jackson Browne. Spinside Records is distributed by Alternative Distribution Alliance, the leading "indie" distribution company in the U.S. The deal with Spinside Records was secured by The Green Children's former manager Cheryl Bogart. The Green Children's first single 'Dragons' was released on August 17, together with a remix by legendary DJ Paul Oakenfold.

The Green Children's self-produced album 'Encounter' was released in October 2010, to great critical acclaim. Rolling Stone described it as a collection of “Searching dance-pop ballads from elfin dreamers…Encounter glides by like Lady Gaga on a unicorn. Sunde gives synth-diva histrionics a mystical spritz, singing about dragons and black magic over skittering electro beats." MOBO wrote that "The Green Children masterfully sprinkle sincere soul and magic into a music scene that requires some much need fantasy and romanticism…The emerald duo’s debut is an audio fairytale that confiscates all grips on reality and leaves one hopelessly daydreaming."

'Encounter Remixed' was released one month later in November 2010, which includes remixes from star DJs such as Moguai and Digital Dog.

In April 2011, a remix of 'Life Saviour' by 7th Heaven (Kylie, Taio Cruz, Shakira) entered the Music Week UK Club charts at #17 (Pop Category).
