= Hear Me Now (The Green Children song) =

Single by The Green Children
- Released: 2006
- Genre: Electropop
- Label: Knightingale Entertainment
- Producer: The Green Children

The Green Children singles chronology
"Hear Me Now" (2006)	"Life Was Beautiful" (2009)

"Hear Me Now" (2006) is the first single by European band the Green Children. As with their previous albums, a percentage of the proceeds were donated to The Green Children Foundation, their charity, which benefits orphaned children and animals in need.

In June 2006, The Green Children shot a music video in Bangladesh to celebrate the work of Professor Muhammad Yunus, the father of microcredit and founder of Grameen Bank. In December 2006, the Green Children released a fundraising CD/DVD entitled Hear Me Now throughout Norway. Through sales and donations from around the world they raised $400,000 for one of the first eye hospitals in rural Bangladesh. The hospital was opened on May 12, 2008, by The Green Children and Professor Muhammad Yunus, the 2006 Nobel Peace Prize winner. Yunus initiated this project with Grameen to save the sight of many of his countrymen and women.

The single was later released in 2009 together with an unplugged version.

== Track listings ==
"Hear Me Now" CD (2006)

1. "Hear Me Now"
2. "I See You"
3. "Give It All Up"
4. "Waves"

Hear Me Now DVD

1. "Hear Me Now (Video)"
2. "Message from Professor Yunus"

"Hear Me Now" (2009)

1. "Hear Me Now"
2. "Heal Me Now (Unplugged)"

== Personnel ==
- Milla Sunde
- Marlow Bevan
- Professor Muhammad Yunus
