= The Man in the Moone =

1638 novel by Francis Godwin

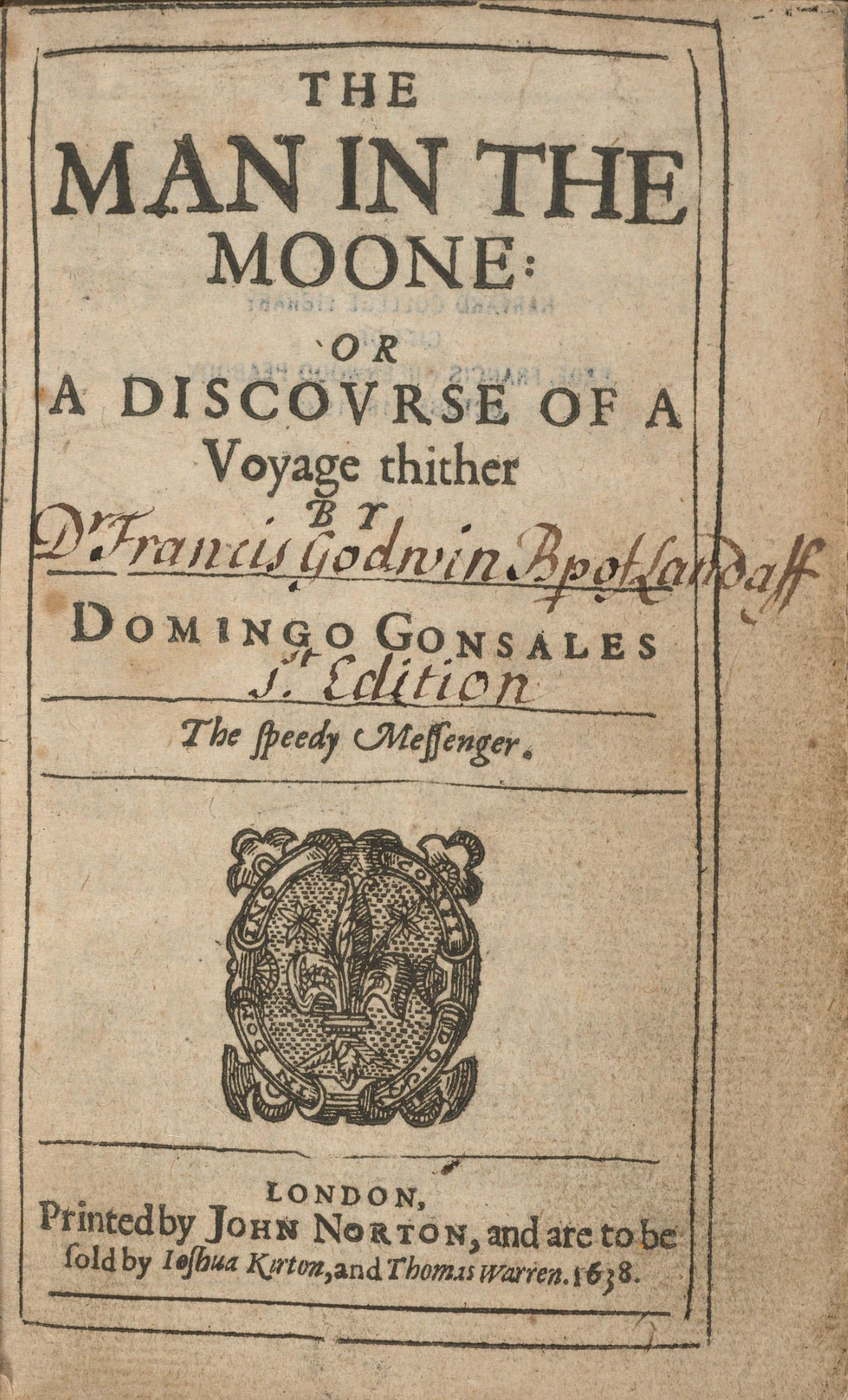
- Title page of the first edition
- Author: Francis Godwin
- Original title: The Man in the Moone or A Discourse of a Voyage Thither by Domingo Gonsales
- Language: English
- Genre: Science fiction
- Published: 1638 (John Norton, London)

The Man in the Moone is a book by the English divine and Anglican bishop Francis Godwin, describing a "voyage of utopian discovery". Long considered to be one of his early works, it is now generally thought to have been written in the late 1620s. It was first published posthumously in 1638 under the pseudonym of Domingo Gonsales. The work is notable for its role in what was called the "new astronomy", the branch of astronomy influenced especially by Nicolaus Copernicus. Although Copernicus is the only astronomer mentioned by name, the book also draws on the theories of Johannes Kepler and William Gilbert. Godwin's astronomical theories were greatly influenced by Galileo Galilei's Sidereus Nuncius (1610), but unlike Galileo, Godwin proposes that the dark spots on the Moon are seas, one of many parallels with Kepler's Somnium sive opus posthumum de astronomia lunari of 1634.

The story is written as a first-person narrative from the perspective of Domingo Gonsales, the book's fictional author. In his opening address to the reader the equally fictional translator "E. M." promises "an essay of Fancy, where Invention is shewed with Judgment".

Some critics consider The Man in the Moone, along with Kepler's Somnium, to be one of the first works of science fiction. The book was well known in the 17th century, and even inspired parodies by Cyrano de Bergerac and Aphra Behn, but has been neglected in critical history. Recent studies have focused on Godwin's theories of language, the mechanics of lunar travel, and his religious position and sympathies as evidenced in the book.

== Plot summary ==
Domingo Gonsales is a citizen of Spain, forced to flee to the East Indies after killing a man in a duel. There he prospers by trading in jewels, and having made his fortune decides to return to Spain. On his voyage home he becomes seriously ill, and he and a black servant Diego are put ashore on St. Helena, a remote island with a reputation for "temperate and healthful" air. A scarcity of food forces Gonsales and Diego to live some miles apart, but Gonsales devises a variety of systems to allow them to communicate. (Note: Remote signalling was one of Godwin's "personal obsessions".) Eventually he comes to rely on a species of bird he describes as some kind of wild swan, a gansa, to carry messages and provisions between himself and Diego. Gonsales gradually comes to realise that these birds are able to carry substantial burdens, and resolves to construct a device by which a number of them harnessed together might be able to support the weight of a man, allowing him to move around the island more conveniently. Following a successful test flight he determines to resume his voyage home, hoping that he might "fill the world with the Fame of [his] Glory and Renown". But on his way back to Spain, accompanied by his birds and the device he calls his Engine, his ship is attacked by an English fleet off the coast of Tenerife and he is forced to escape by taking to the air. (Note: At the time the book was written England was at war with Spain.)

After setting down briefly on Tenerife, Gonsales is forced to take off again by the imminent approach of hostile natives. But rather than flying to a place of safety among the Spanish inhabitants of the island the gansas fly higher and higher. On the first day of his flight Gonsales encounters "illusions of 'Devils and Wicked Spirits'" in the shape of men and women, some of whom he is able to converse with. They provide him with food and drink for his journey and promise to set him down safely in Spain if only he will join their "Fraternity", and "enter into such Covenants as they had made to their Captain and Master, whom they would not name". Gonsales declines their offer, and after a journey of 12 days reaches the Moon. Suddenly feeling very hungry he opens the provisions he was given en route, only to find nothing but dry leaves, goat's hair and animal dung, and that his wine "stunk like Horse-piss". He is soon discovered by the inhabitants of the Moon, the Lunars, whom he finds to be tall Christian people enjoying a happy and carefree life in a kind of pastoral paradise. (Note: Godwin proposes that as the Earth is magnetic, only an initial push is necessary to escape its magnetic attraction, a push provided by the gansas.) Gonsales discovers that order is maintained in this apparently utopian state by swapping delinquent children with terrestrial children. (Note: Godwin cites the green children of Woolpit as an example of Lunar children sent to Earth. The Lunars call their god Martinus, which might reflect the name of the green children's home, St Martin's Land.)

The Lunars speak a language consisting "not so much of words and letters as tunes and strange sounds", which Gonsales succeeds in gaining some fluency in after a couple of months. Six months or so after his arrival Gonsales becomes concerned about the condition of his gansas, three of whom have died. Fearing that he may never be able to return to Earth and see his children again if he delays further, he decides to take leave of his hosts, carrying with him a gift of precious stones from the supreme monarch of the Moon, Irdonozur. The stones are of three different sorts: Poleastis, which can store and generate great quantities of heat; Macbrus, which generates great quantities of light; and Ebelus, which when one side of the stone is clasped to the skin renders a man weightless, or half as heavy again if the other side is touched.

Gonsales harnesses his gansas to his Engine and leaves the Moon on 29 March 1601. He lands in China about nine days later, without re-encountering the illusions of men and women he had seen on his outward journey and with the help of his Ebelus, which helps the birds to avoid plummeting to Earth as the weight of Gonsales and his Engine threatens to become too much for them. (Note: Gonsales speculates that his return journey was two days shorter than his outward journey because of the eagerness of his gansas to return to their home, or the Earth's greater magnetic attraction. A modern mathematician, Andrew Simoson, has pointed out that the discrepancy can also be explained by the gansas flying directly towards where they could see the Moon to be on their outward journey. Therefore rather than travelling in a straight line they flew in a pursuit curve, attempting to catch up with the Moon as it orbited the Earth. But as the Earth orbits the Sun more slowly than the Moon orbits the Earth, the pursuit curve for the return journey was correspondingly shorter, and hence the journey home quicker.) He is quickly arrested and taken before the local mandarin, accused of being a magician, and as a result is confined in the mandarin's palace. He learns to speak the local dialect of Chinese, and after some months of confinement is summoned before the mandarin to give an account of himself and his arrival in China, which gains him the mandarin's trust and favour. Gonsales hears of a group of Jesuits, and is granted permission to visit them. (Note: A Jesuit mission was set up in Beijing in 1601 by Matteo Ricci and Diego de Pantoja.) He writes an account of his adventures, which the Jesuits arrange to have sent back to Spain. The story ends with Gonsales's fervent wish that he may one day be allowed to return to Spain, and "that by enriching my country with the knowledge of these hidden mysteries, I may at least reap the glory of my fortunate misfortunes".

== Background and contexts ==
Godwin, the son of Thomas Godwin, Bishop of Bath and Wells, was elected a student of Christ Church, Oxford, in 1578, from where he received his Bachelor of Arts (1581) and Master of Arts degrees (1584). After entering the church he gained his Bachelor (1594) and Doctor of Divinity (1596) degrees. He gained prominence (even internationally) in 1601 by publishing his Catalogue of the Bishops of England since the first planting of the Christian Religion in this Island, which enabled his rapid rise in the church hierarchy. During his life, he was known as a historian.

=== Scientific advances and lunar speculation ===
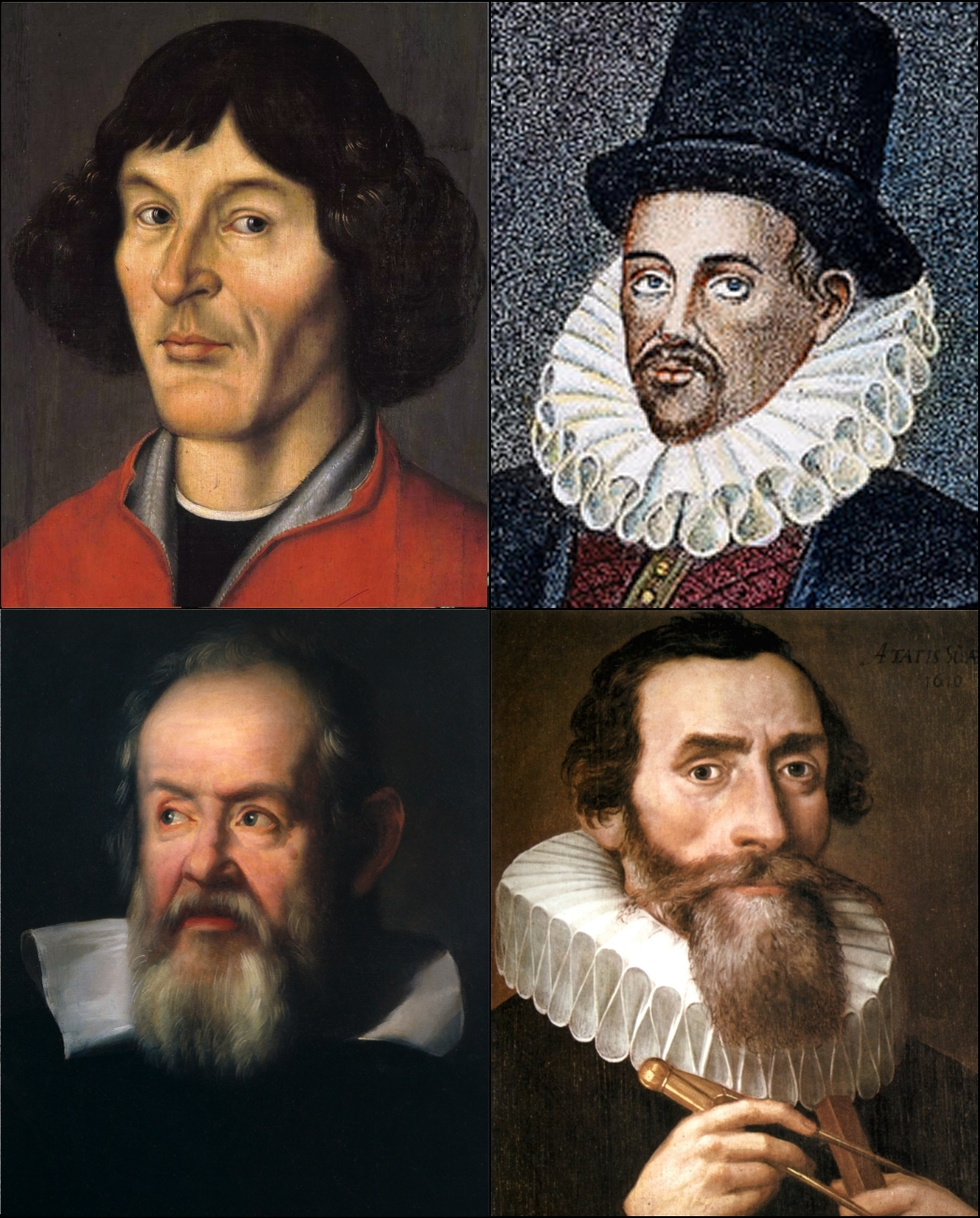
Clockwise, from top left: Copernicus, Gilbert, Kepler, Galileo

Godwin's book appeared in a time of great interest in the Moon and astronomical phenomena, and of important developments in celestial observation, mathematics and mechanics. The influence particularly of Nicolaus Copernicus led to what was called the "new astronomy"; Copernicus is the only astronomer Godwin mentions by name, but the theories of Johannes Kepler and William Gilbert are also discernible. Galileo Galilei's 1610 publication Sidereus Nuncius (usually translated as "The Sidereal Messenger") had a great influence on Godwin's astronomical theories, although Godwin proposes (unlike Galileo) that the dark spots on the Moon are seas, one of many similarities between The Man in the Moone and Kepler's Somnium sive opus posthumum de astronomia lunaris of 1634 ("The Dream, or Posthumous Work on Lunar Astronomy").

Speculation on lunar habitation was nothing new in Western thought, but it intensified in England during the early 17th century: Philemon Holland's 1603 translation of Plutarch's Moralia introduced Greco-Roman speculation to the English vernacular, and poets including Edmund Spenser proposed that other worlds, including the Moon, could be inhabited. Such speculation was prompted also by the expanding geographical view of the world. The 1630s saw the publication of a translation of Lucian's True History (1634), containing two accounts of trips to the Moon, and a new edition of Ariosto's Orlando Furioso, likewise featuring an ascent to the Moon. In both books the Moon is inhabited, and this theme was given an explicit religious importance by writers such as John Donne, who in Ignatius His Conclave (1611, with new editions in 1634 and 1635) satirised a "lunatic church" on the Moon founded by Lucifer and the Jesuits. Lunar speculation reached an acme at the end of the decade, with the publication of Godwin's The Man in the Moone (1638) and John Wilkins's The Discovery of a World in the Moone (also 1638, and revised in 1640).

=== Dating evidence ===
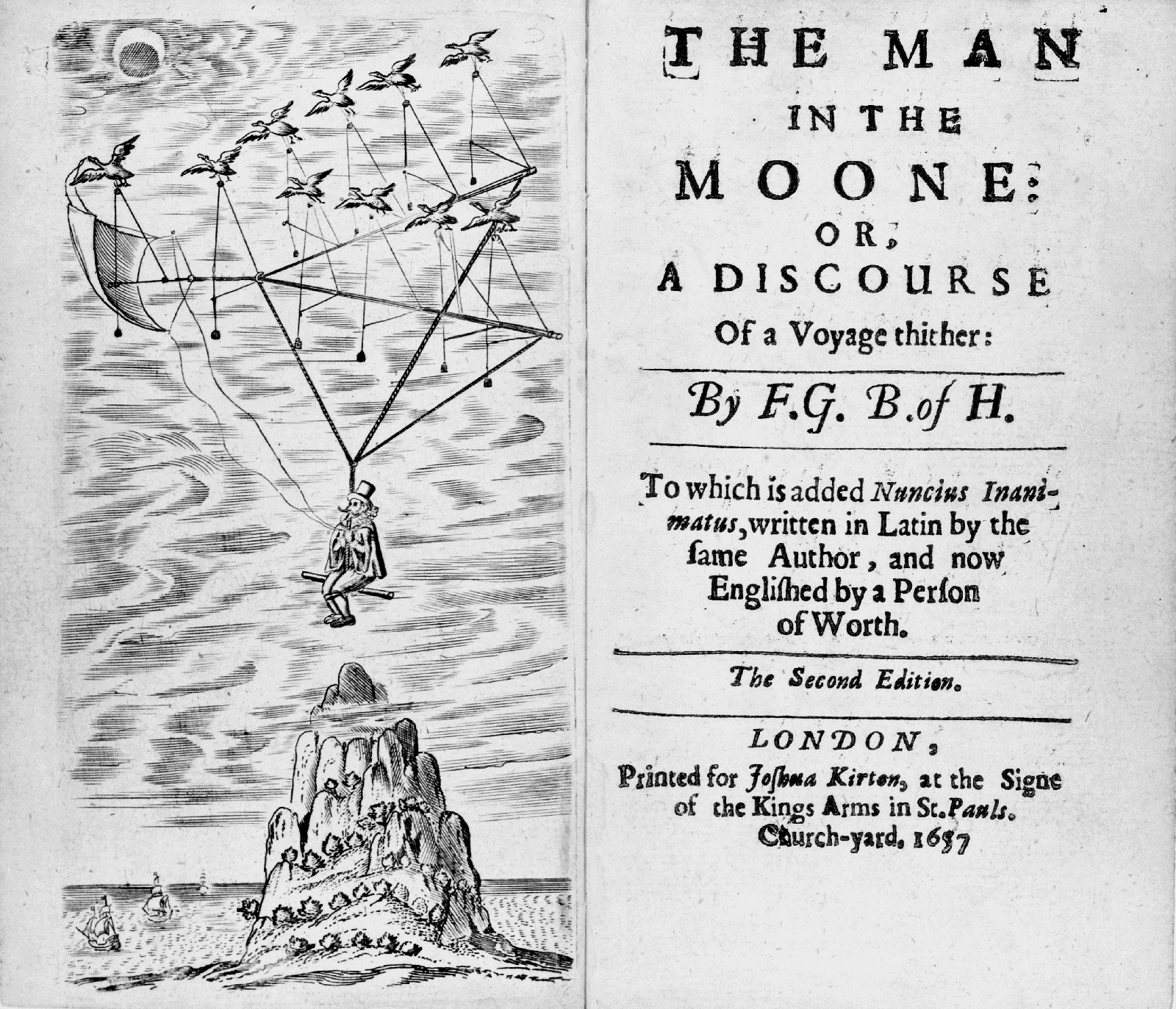
Frontispiece and title page of the second edition (1657), now with the pseudonym replaced by "F.G. B. of H." ("Francis Godwin, Bishop of Hereford")

Until Grant McColley, a historian of early Modern English literature, published his "The Date of Godwin's Domingo Gonsales" in 1937, it was thought that Godwin wrote The Man in the Moone relatively early in his life – perhaps during his time at Christ Church from 1578 to 1584, or maybe even as late as 1603. But McColley proposed a much later date of 1627 or 1628, based on internal and biographical evidence. A number of ideas about the physical properties of the Earth and the Moon, including claims about "a secret property that operates in a manner similar to that of a loadstone attracting iron", did not appear until after 1620. And Godwin seems to borrow the concept of using a flock of strong, trained birds to fly Gonsales to the Moon from Francis Bacon's Sylva sylvarum ("Natural History"), published in July 1626. All this evidence supports McColley's dating of "1626–29, with the probable years of composition 1627–28", which is now generally accepted.

William Poole, in his 2009 edition of The Man in the Moone, provides additional evidence for a later dating. Godwin, he argues, most likely got his knowledge of the Jesuit mission in China (founded in 1601) from a 1625 edition of Samuel Purchas's Purchas his Pilgrimage. This book contains a redaction from Nicolas Trigault's De Christiana expeditione apud Sinas suscepta ab Societate Jesu (1615) ("Concerning the Christian expedition to China undertaken by the Society of Jesus"), itself the redaction of a manuscript by the Jesuit priest Matteo Ricci. Poole also sees the influence of Robert Burton, who in the second volume of The Anatomy of Melancholy had speculated on gaining astronomical knowledge through telescopic observation (citing Galileo) or from space travel (Lucian). Appearing for the first time in the 1628 edition of the Anatomy is a section on planetary periods, which gives a period for Mars of three years – had Godwin used William Gilbert's De Magnete (1600) for this detail he would have found a Martian period of two years. Finally, Poole points to what he calls a "genetic debt": while details on for instance the Martian period could have come from a few other sources, Burton and Godwin are the only two writers of the time to combine an interest in alien life with the green children of Woolpit, from a 12th-century account of two mysterious green children found in Suffolk. Poole sees this reference as strong evidence for Godwin's reliance on Burton.

One of Godwin's "major intellectual debts" is to Gilbert's De Magnete, in which Gilbert argued that the Earth was magnetic, though he may have used a derivative account by Mark Ridley or a geographical textbook by Nathanael Carpenter. It is unlikely that Godwin could have gathered first-hand evidence used in narrating the events in his book (such as the details of Gonsales's journey back from the East, especially a description of Saint Helena and its importance as a resting place for sick mariners), and more likely that he relied on travel adventures and other books. He used Trigault's De Christiana expeditione apud Sinas (1615), based on a manuscript by Matteo Ricci, the founder of the Jesuit mission in Beijing in 1601, for information about that mission. Details pertaining to the sea voyage and Saint Helena likely came from Thomas Cavendish's account of his circumnavigation of the world, available in Richard Hakluyt's Principal Navigations (1599–1600) and in Purchas His Pilgrimage, first published in 1613. Information on the Dutch Revolt, the historical setting for the early part of Gonsales' career, likely came from the annals of Emanuel van Meteren, a Dutch historian working in London.

=== English editions and translations ===
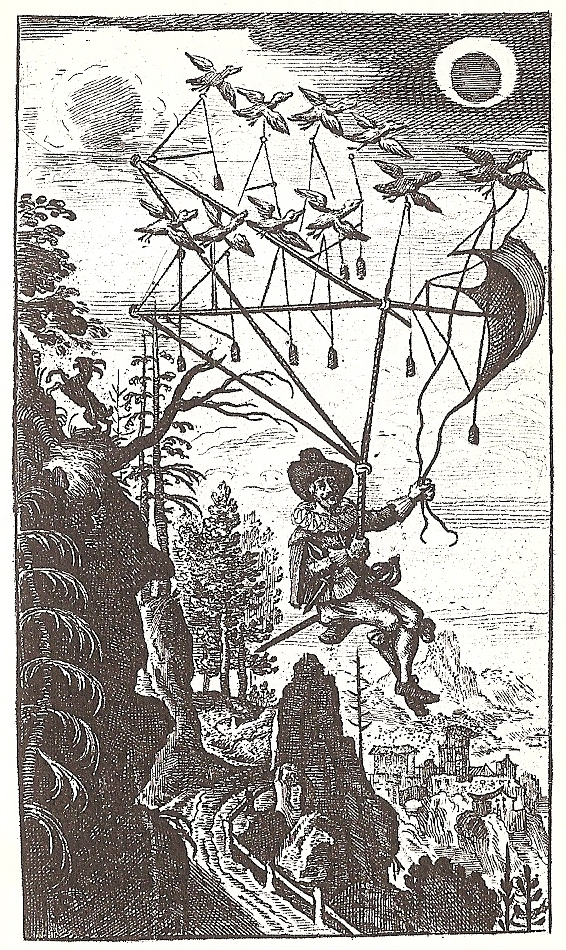
Frontispiece of Der Fliegende Wandersmann nach dem Mond, 1659

McColley knew of only one surviving copy of the first edition, held at the British Museum (now British Library C.56.c.2), which was the basis for his 1937 edition of The Man in the Moone and Nuncius Inanimatus, an edition criticised by literary critic Kathleen Tillotson as lacking in textual care and consistency. H. W. Lawton's review published six years earlier mentions a second copy in the Bibliothèque nationale de France, V.20973 (now RES P- V- 752 (6)), an omission also noted by Tillotson.

For the text of his 2009 edition, William Poole collated a copy in the Bodleian Library Oxford (Ashm. 940(1)) with that in the British Library. The printer of the first edition of The Man in the Moone is identified on the title page as John Norton, and the book was sold by Joshua Kirton and Thomas Warren. It also includes an epistle introducing the work and attributed to "E. M.", perhaps the fictitious Edward Mahon identified in the Stationers' Register as the translator from the original Spanish. Poole speculates that this Edward Mahon might be Thomas or Morgan Godwin, two of the bishop's sons who had worked with their father on telegraphy, but adds that Godwin's third son, Paul, might be involved as well. The partial revision of the manuscript (the first half has dates according to the Gregorian calendar, the second half still follows the superseded Julian calendar) indicates an unfinished manuscript, which Paul might have acquired after his father's death and passed on to his former colleague Joshua Kirton: Paul Godwin and Kirton were apprenticed to the same printer, John Bill, and worked there together for seven years. Paul may have simply continued the "E. M." hoax unknowingly, and/or may have been responsible for partial revision of the manuscript. To the second edition, published in 1657, was added Godwin's Nuncius Inanimatus (in English and Latin; first published in 1629). The third edition was published in 1768; its text was abridged, and a description of St Helena (by printer Nathaniel Crouch) functioned as an introduction.

A French translation by Jean Baudoin, L'Homme dans la Lune, was published in 1648, and republished four more times. (Note: Bürger lists publications from 1651, 1654, 1666, and 1671.) This French version excised the narrative's sections on Lunar Christianity, as so do the many translations based on it, including the German translation incorrectly ascribed to Hans Jakob Christoffel von Grimmelshausen, Der fliegende Wandersmann nach dem Mond, 1659. (Note: The German translation of The Man in the Moone was published in 1660 and 1667 with two texts by Balthasar Venator, one of which also a lunar travel narrative; Grimmelshausen had written an appendix to The Man in the Moone for the 1667 edition (apparently to fill up 13 empty pages at the request of his regular printer, Johann Jonathan Felßecker). Since then, his name has become associated with The Man in the Moone, although the appendix was not reprinted in his collected works. According to Bürger, the German translator of The Man in the Moone may have been Hieronymus Imhof (1606–1668) of Wolfenbüttel, a tutor to the princes at the court of Augustus the Younger, Duke of Brunswick-Lüneburg; the incorrect ascription to Grimmelshausen was cited as recently as 1945.) Johan van Brosterhuysen (c. 1594–1650) translated the book into Dutch, and a Dutch translation – possibly Brosterhuysen's, although the attribution is uncertain – went through seven printings in the Netherlands between 1645 and 1718. The second edition of 1651 and subsequent editions include a continuation of unknown authorship relating Gonsales' further adventures. (Note: W. H. van Seters notes that in 1651 two Dutch publishers, Jacob Benjamin in Amsterdam and I. G. van Houten in The Hague, published different continuations of the narrative, both bound with the second edition of Godwin's book; Benjamin's continuation is signed E. M., the initials of Godwin's fictional narrator. The continuation by van Houten exists in only one printing, but he had apparently planned for a third volume, a sequel to the sequel.)

== Themes ==
=== Religion ===
The story is set during the reign of Queen Elizabeth I, a period of religious conflict in England. Not only was there the threat of a Catholic resurgence but there were also disputes within the Protestant Church. When Gonsales first encounters the Lunars he exclaims "Jesu Maria", at which the Lunars fall to their knees, but although they revere the name of Jesus they are unfamiliar with the name Maria, suggesting that they are Protestants rather than Catholics; Poole is of the same opinion: "their lack of reaction to the name of Mary suggests that they have not fallen into the errors of the Catholic Church, despite some otherwise rather Catholic-looking institutions on the moon". Beginning in the 1580s, when Godwin was a student at Oxford University, many publications criticising the governance of the established Church of England circulated widely, until in 1586 censorship was introduced, resulting in the Martin Marprelate controversy. Martin Marprelate was the name used by the anonymous author or authors of the illegal tracts attacking the Church published between 1588 and 1589. A number of commentators, including Grant McColley, have suggested that Godwin strongly objected to the imposition of censorship, expressed in Gonsales's hope that the publication of his account may not prove "prejudicial to the Catholic faith". John Clark has suggested that the Martin Marprelate controversy may have inspired Godwin to give the name Martin to the Lunars' god, but as a bishop of the Church of England it is perhaps unlikely that he was generally sympathetic to the Martin Marprelate position. Critics do not agree on the precise denomination of Godwin's Lunars. In contrast with Clark and Poole, David Cressy argues that the Lunars falling to their knees after Gonsales's exclamation (a similar ritual takes place at the court of Irdonozur) is evidence of "a fairly mechanical form of religion (as most of Godwin's Protestant contemporaries judged Roman Catholicism)".

By the time The Man in the Moone was published, discussion on the plurality of worlds had begun to favour the possibility of extraterrestrial life. For Christian thinkers such a plurality is intimately connected to Christ and his redemption of man: if there are other worlds, do they share a similar history, and does Christ also redeem them in his sacrifice? According to Philipp Melanchthon, a 16th-century theologian who worked closely with Martin Luther, "It must not be imagined that there are many worlds, because it must not be imagined that Christ died or was resurrected more often, nor must it be thought that in any other world without the knowledge of the son of God, that men would be restored to eternal life". Similar comments were made by Calvinist theologian Lambert Daneau. Midway through the 17th century the matter appears to have been settled in favour of a possible plurality, which was accepted by Henry More and Aphra Behn among others; "by 1650, the Elizabethan Oxford examination question an sint plures mundi? ('can these be many worlds?' – to which the correct Aristotelian answer was 'no') had been replaced by the disputation thesis quod Luna sit habitabilis ('that the moon could be habitable' – which might be answered 'probably' if not 'yes')".

=== Lunar language ===
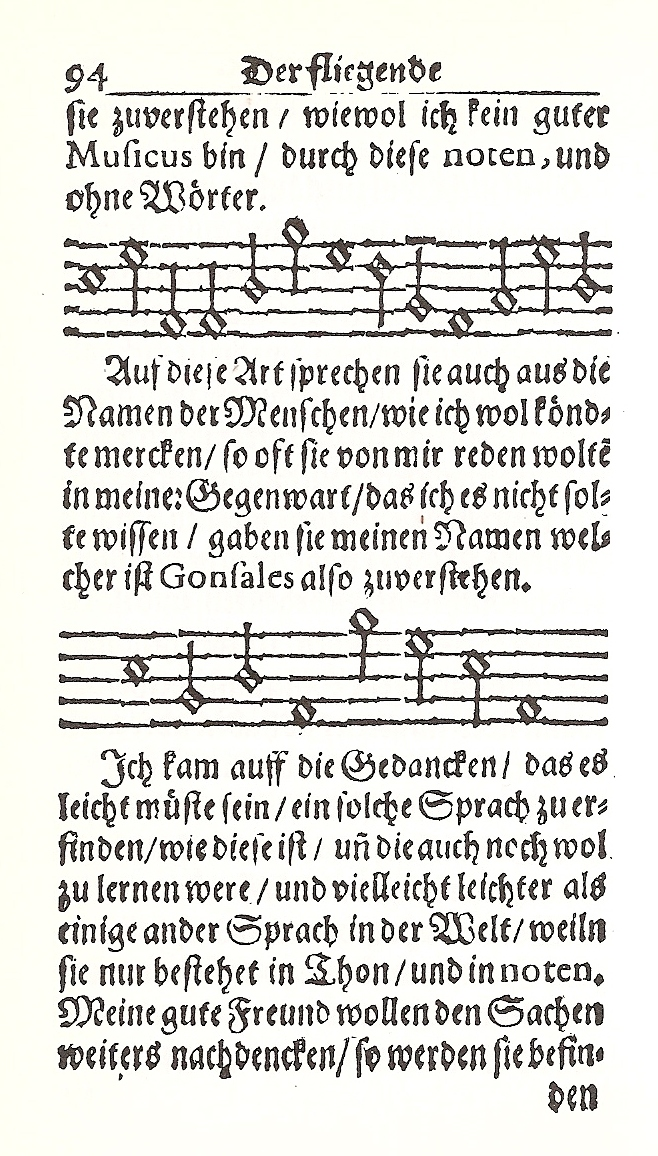
Transcription of lunar language, from the 1659 German edition

Godwin had a lifelong interest in language and communication (as is evident in Gonsales's various means of communicating with his servant Diego on St Helena), and this was the topic of his Nuncius inanimatus (1629). The language Gonsales encounters on the Moon bears no relation to any he is familiar with, and it takes him months to acquire sufficient fluency to communicate properly with the inhabitants. While its vocabulary appears limited, its possibilities for meaning are multiplied since the meaning of words and phrases also depends on tone. Invented languages were an important element of earlier fantastical accounts such as Thomas More's Utopia, François Rabelais's Gargantua and Pantagruel and Joseph Hall's Mundus Alter et Idem, all books that Godwin was familiar with. P. Cornelius, in a study of invented languages in imaginary travel accounts from the 17th and 18th centuries, proposes that a perfect, rationally organised language is indicative of the Enlightenment's rationalism. As H. Neville Davies argues, Godwin's imaginary language is more perfect than for instance More's in one aspect: it is spoken on the entire Moon and has not suffered from the Earthly dispersion of languages caused by the fall of the Tower of Babel.

One of Godwin's sources for his Lunar language was Trigault's De Christiana expeditione apud Sinas. Gonsales provides two examples of spoken phrases, written down in a cipher later explained by John Wilkins in Mercury, or The Secret and Swift Messenger (1641). Trigault's account of the Chinese language gave Godwin the idea of assigning tonality to the Lunar language, and of appreciating it in the language spoken by the Chinese mandarins Gonsales encounters after his return to Earth. Gonsales claims that in contrast to the multitude of languages in China (making their speakers mutually unintelligible), the mandarins' language is universal by virtue of tonality (he suppresses it in the other varieties of Chinese). Thus the mandarins are able to maintain a cultural and spiritual superiority resembling that of the Lunar upper class, which is to be placed in contrast with the variety of languages spoken in a fractured and morally degenerate Europe and elsewhere. Knowlson argues that using the term "language" is overstating the case, and that cipher is the proper term: "In spite of Godwin's claims, this musical 'language' is not in fact a language at all, but simply a cipher in which the letters of an existing language may be transcribed". He suggests Godwin's source may have been a book by Joan Baptista Porta, whose De occultis literarum notis (1606) (Note: This is a revised edition of his De furtivis literarum notis, vulgo de Ziferis libri iiii, first published in Naples in 1563.) contains "an exact description of the method he was to adopt".

== Genre ==
The book's genre has been variously categorised. When it was first published the literary genre of utopian fantasy was in its infancy, and critics have recognised how Godwin used a utopian setting to criticise the institutions of his time: the Moon was "the ideal perspective from which to view the earth" and its "moral attitudes and social institutions," according to Maurice Bennett. Other critics have referred to the book as "utopia", "Renaissance utopia" or "picaresque adventure". While some critics claim it as one of the first works of science fiction, there is no general agreement that it is even "proto-science-fiction".

Early commentators recognised that the book is a kind of picaresque novel, and comparisons with Don Quixote were being made as early as 1638. In structure as well as content The Man in the Moone somewhat resembles the anonymous Spanish novella Lazarillo de Tormes (1554); both books begin with a genealogy and start out in Salamanca, featuring a man who travels from master to master seeking his fortune. But most critics agree that the picaresque mode is not sustained throughout, and that Godwin intentionally achieves a "generic transformation".

Godwin's book follows a venerable tradition of travel literature that blends the excitement of journeys to foreign places with utopian reflection; More's Utopia is cited as a forerunner, as is the account of Amerigo Vespucci. Godwin could fall back on an extensive body of work describing the voyages undertaken by his protagonist, including books by Hakluyt and Jan Huyghen van Linschoten, and the narratives deriving from the Jesuit mission in Beijing.

== Reception and influence ==
The Man in the Moone was published five months after The Discovery of a World in the Moone by John Wilkins, later bishop of Chester. Wilkins refers to Godwin once, in a discussion of spots in the Moon, but not to Godwin's book. In the third edition of The Discovery (1640), however, Wilkins provides a summary of Godwin's book, and later in Mercury (1641) he comments on The Man in the Moone and Nuncius Inanimatus, saying that "the former text could be used to unlock the secrets of the latter". The Man in the Moone quickly became an international "source of humour and parody": Cyrano de Bergerac, using Baudoin's 1648 translation, parodied it in L'Autre Monde: où les États et Empires de la Lune (1657); Cyrano's traveller actually meets Gonsales, who is still on the Moon, "degraded to the status of pet monkey". It was one of the inspirations for what has been called the first science fiction text in the Americas, Syzygies and Lunar Quadratures Aligned to the Meridian of Mérida of the Yucatán by an Anctitone or Inhabitant of the Moon ... by Manuel Antonio de Rivas (1775). The Laputan language of Jonathan Swift, who was a distant relation of Godwin's, may have been influenced by The Man in the Moone, either directly or through Cyrano de Bergerac.

The Man in the Moone became a popular source for "often extravagantly staged comic drama and opera", including Aphra Behn's The Emperor of the Moon, a 1687 play "inspired by ... the third edition of [The Man in the Moone], and the English translation of Cyrano's work", and Elkanah Settle's The World in the Moon (1697). Thomas D'Urfey's Wonders in the Sun, or the Kingdom of the Birds (1706) was "really a sequel, starring Domingo and Diego". Its popularity was not limited to English; a Dutch farce, Don Domingo Gonzales of de Man in de maan, formerly considered to have been written by Maria de Wilde, was published in 1755.

The book's influence continued into the 19th century. Edgar Allan Poe in an appendix to "The Unparalleled Adventure of One Hans Pfaall" called it "a singular and somewhat ingenious little book". Poe assumed the author to be French, an assumption also made by Jules Verne in his From the Earth to the Moon (1865), suggesting that they may have been using Baudoin's translation. H. G. Wells's The First Men in the Moon (1901) has several parallels with Godwin's fantasy, including the use of a stone to induce weightlessness. But The Man in the Moone has nevertheless been given only "lukewarm consideration in different histories of English literature", and its importance is downplayed in studies of Utopian literature. Frank E. Manuel and Fritzie P. Manuel's Utopian Thought in the Western World (winner of the 1979 National Book Award for Nonfiction) mentions it only in passing, saying that Godwin "treats primarily of the mechanics of flight with the aid of a crew of birds", and that The Man in the Moone, like Bergerac's and Wilkins's books, lacks "high seriousness and unified moral purpose".

Gonsales's load-carrying birds have also left their mark. The Oxford English Dictionary's entry for gansa reads "One of the birds (called elsewhere 'wild swans') which drew Domingo Gonsales to the Moon in the romance by Bp. F. Godwin". For the etymology it suggests ganzæ, found in Philemon Holland's 1601 translation of Pliny the Elder's Natural History. Michael van Langren, the 17th-century Dutch astronomer and cartographer, named one of the lunar craters for them, Gansii, later renamed Halley.

== Modern editions ==
- The Man in the Moone: or a Discourse of a Voyage thither by Domingo Gonsales, 1638. Facsimile reprint, Scolar Press, 1971.
- The Man in the Moone and Nuncius Inanimatus, ed. Grant McColley. Smith College Studies in Modern Languages 19. 1937. Repr. Logaston Press, 1996.
- The Man in the Moone. A Story of Space Travel in the Early 17th Century, 1959.
- The Man in the Moone, in Charles C. Mish, Short Fiction of the Seventeenth Century, 1963. Based on the second edition, with modernised text (an "eccentric choice").
- The Man in the Moone, in Faith K. Pizor and T. Allan Comp, eds., The Man in the Moone and Other Lunar Fantasies. Praeger, 1971.
- The Man in the Moone, ed. William Poole. Broadview, 2009. ISBN 978-1-55111-896-3.

=== Monographs on The Man in the Moone ===
- Anke Janssen, Francis Godwins "The Man in the Moone": Die Entdeckung des Romans als Medium der Auseinandersetzung mit Zeitproblemen. Peter Lang, 1981.
