= The Green Child =

1935 novel by Herbert Read

- First edition
- Author: Herbert Read
- Language: English
- Genre: Fantasy
- Published: 1935 (Heinemann)
- Publication place: United Kingdom

The Green Child is the only completed novel by the English anarchist poet and critic Herbert Read. Written in 1934 and first published by Heinemann in 1935, the story is based on the 12th-century legend of two green children who mysteriously appeared in the English village of Woolpit, speaking an apparently unknown language. Read described the legend in his English Prose Style, published in 1931, as "the norm to which all types of fantasy should conform".

Each of the novel's three parts ends with the apparent death of the story's protagonist, President Olivero, dictator of the fictional South American Republic of Roncador. In each case Olivero's death is an allegory for his translation to a "more profound level of existence", reflecting the book's overall theme of a search for the meaning of life. Read's interest in psychoanalytic theory is evident throughout the novel, which is constructed as a "philosophic myth ... in the tradition of Plato".

The story contains many autobiographical elements, and the character of Olivero owes much to Read's experiences as an officer in the British Army during the First World War. The novel was positively received, although some commentators have considered it to be "inscrutable", and one has suggested that it has been so differently and vaguely interpreted by those who have given it serious study that it may lack the form and content to justify the praise it has received.

== Biographical background and publication ==
Primarily a literary critic, poet, and an advocate for modern art, Read wrote his only novel, The Green Child, in about eight weeks during 1934, most of it in the summer house behind his home in Hampstead, London. Hampstead was then a "nest of gentle artists" who included Henry Moore, Paul Nash, Ben Nicholson, and Barbara Hepworth. Read was at that time interested in the idea of unconscious composition, and the first sixteen pages of the manuscript – written on different paper from the rest – are considered by some critics to look like the recollection of a dream. Read claimed in a letter written to psychoanalyst Carl Jung that the novel was a product of automatic writing. The original manuscript is in the possession of the University of Leeds Library; Read had been a student at the university.

Following the Russian Revolution of 1917 Read became a supporter of communism, believing it to offer "the social liberty of my ideals", but by the 1930s his conviction had begun to waver. Increasingly his political ideology leaned towards anarchism, but it was not until the outbreak of the Spanish Civil War in 1936 that Read became confirmed in his anarchist beliefs and stated them explicitly. The Green Child was therefore written at a time when Read's political and philosophical ideas were in flux.

Christian faith might have borne poorer fruits than this sense of unattainable glory lodged in the child's brain on a Yorkshire farm forty years ago.

— Graham Greene

There have been six editions of the novel, the first from Heinemann in 1935, priced at 7 shillings and sixpence, the equivalent of about £23 in 2025. Ten years later a second edition was published by Grey Walls Press, with the addition of illustrations by Felix Kelly. A third edition, for which Graham Greene wrote an introduction focusing on the novel's autobiographical elements, was published by Eyre and Spottiswoode in 1947. The first American edition was published in New York by New Directions in 1948, with an introduction by Kenneth Rexroth. Penguin Books published a fifth edition in 1979, which included the 1947 introduction by Greene. A sixth edition, published by R. Clark and again containing Greene's introduction, appeared in 1989 and was reprinted in 1995.

== Plot summary ==
The first and last parts of the story are told as a third-person narrative, but the middle part is written in the first person. The story begins in 1861 with the faked death of President Olivero, dictator of the South American Republic of Roncador, who has staged his own assassination. He returns to his native England, to the village where he was born and raised. On the evening of his arrival, Olivero notices that the stream running through the village appears to be flowing backwards, and he decides to follow the water upstream to discover the cause.

The stream's course leads Olivero to a mill, where through a lighted window he sees a woman tied to a chair, forced by the miller to drink the blood of a freshly slaughtered lamb. Instinctively, Olivero hurls himself through the open window, his "leap into the world of fantasy". The miller initially offers no resistance and allows Olivero to release the woman, whom he recognises by the colour of her skin to be Sally, one of the two green children who had mysteriously arrived in the village on the day he left, thirty years earlier; Olivero also recognises the miller as Kneeshaw, an ex-pupil at the village school where he had once taught. During a struggle between the two men Kneeshaw is accidentally drowned in the mill pond. The next morning Olivero and Sally continue on Olivero's quest to find the stream's destination, a pool in the moors high above the village. Paddling in its water, Sally begins to sink into the silvery sand covering its bed. Olivero rushes to her, and hand in hand they sink beneath the water of the pool.

The book's second part recounts the events between Oliver leaving the village as its young schoolmaster and his return as ex-President Olivero. He travels to London initially, hoping to find employment as a writer, but after three years spent working as a bookkeeper in a tailor's shop he takes passage on a ship which lands him in Cádiz, Spain. Unable to speak the language, and in possession of a book by Voltaire, he is arrested as a suspected revolutionary. Held captive for two years, he learns Spanish from his fellow prisoners and determines to travel to one of the liberated American colonies he has learned of, where the possibility exists to establish a new world "free from the oppression and injustice of the old world".

Freed in an amnesty following the death of King Ferdinand of Spain, Oliver makes his way to Buenos Aires. There he is mistaken for a revolutionary agent and taken to meet General Santos of the Roncador Army. Together they hatch a plot to seize the country's capital city and assassinate its dictator. The plot is successful and "Don Olivero" finds himself leader of the Assembly, making him the country's new dictator, a position he holds for 25 years. Eventually he realises that his style of government is leading the country into stagnation and "moral flaccidity"; he begins to feel nostalgia for the English village where he was brought up, and resolves to escape. Wishing to avoid any suspicion that he is deserting Roncador, Olivero fakes his own assassination.

The final part of the book continues the story from when Olivero and Sally disappear under the water. A large bubble forms around them, transporting them to the centre of the pool and ascending into a large grotto, from where they proceed on foot through a series of adjoining caverns. Sally tells Olivero that this is the country she and her brother left 30 years ago. Soon they encounter her people, to whom Sally, or Siloēn as she is properly known, explains that many years ago she wandered off and became lost, but that she has now returned with one who "was lost too, and now wishes to dwell among us". Olivero and Siloēn are welcomed into the community, where life is ordered around a progression from lower to upper ledges: the first ledge teaches the pleasures of youth; on the second ledge the pleasure of manual work is learned; on the third of opinion and argument; and finally, on the upper ledge, the "highest pleasure", of solitary thought.

Olivero soon tires of the first ledge, and leaving Siloēn behind he moves to the second, where he learns to cut and polish crystals, the most sacred of objects in this subterranean world. Eventually he is allowed to move to the highest ledge of all, "the final stage of life". There he is taught the "basic principles of the universe", that there is only Order and Disorder. "Order ... [is] the space-filling Mass about them ... Disorder is empty space". Disorder is caused by the senses, which, "being confined to the body ... create the illusion of self-hood". Olivero selects a grotto in which to spend what remains of his life alone, contemplating the "natural and absolute beauty" of the crystals he accepts from the crystal-cutters. Food and water is brought regularly, and he settles to the task of preparing his body for "the perfection of death", which when it comes he meets with a "peculiar joy". Removing Olivero's body from the grotto the attendants encounter another group carrying Siloēn, who died at the same time as Olivero. The pair are laid together in a petrifying trough, to "become part of the same crystal harmony", as is customary when any of the Green people die.

== Genre and style ==
Richard Wasson, professor of English, has said that The Green Child is "defiant of classification", complicated by its division into "three arbitrarily related sections". The first part of the novel adopts the style of a 19th-century Gothic fairy tale. The "fluid, seemingly unbroken hand" in which it is written has encouraged the notion that it was produced in a single sitting, followed by a break before the second part was begun. Part two is written as a "conventional political adventure", in which Olivero tells in flashback the story of his rise to power as the dictator of Roncador. The final part of the novel continues the narrative where the first left off, in the "fantastical, subterranean world of the Green people". So different in style is the first part from what follows that some critics regard it as an entirely separate work, or "the 'true' novel".

Olivero's quest in the underground world is written as a reversal of Plato's allegory of the cave as described in his Republic. In Plato's allegory, prisoners confined in a cave and condemned to stare at a blank wall, with only the light from a flickering fire behind them, see just the shadows of what is real; the philosopher, on the other hand, is like someone released from the cave, able to see the true form of what is casting the shadows. Read turns the idea on its head; when Siloēn left her subterranean world she left behind the Platonic "eternal forms", and Olivero has to follow her back to her "cave" to discover the "divine essence of things".

When death came to Olivero, he felt with peculiar joy the gradual release of his limbs from the stream of blood and the agents of pain that had for so long kept possession ... The beating of his heart was like the jumping of a flame in an empty lamp. Summoning his last vital effort, he stilled for all time that anxious agitation.

— Herbert Read

In the last few pages of the book, in which Olivero prepares for his death and petrification, Read describes Olivero's final thoughts in a form adapted from Plato's Phaedo, but in an almost mirror image. (Note: In the manuscript, the final part of the story is prefaced by an extract from the Phaedo: "Wherefore, if ye desire of me a tale, hearken to the Tale of the things that be beyond upon the Earth under the Heaven". It was omitted from the published version.) Socrates, whose thoughts on the afterlife Plato was describing, argued that death was the ideal home of the soul, but Olivero longs for his body to be free from the torments of the soul, to become part of the crystalline solidity of the universe. Olivero regards life, not death, as the destroyer, "for it [life] disrupts the harmony of inorganic matter". Socrates' suggestion, towards the end of the Phaedo, that our own world is but one of many, each a hollow in the earth connected by underground rivers, is a strikingly similar image to the subterranean land of the Green people that Read describes. Read however was "almost certainly" influenced in his depiction of the world of the Green people by W. H. Hudson's 1887 utopian novel A Crystal Age, a story in which people strive to "live above their own mortality".

== Themes ==
The novel's overarching theme is "a dialectical search for the meaning of life, a search which involves a return to life's source". The Green people's emphasis on achieving "a literal oneness with the material universe" by petrifying the bodies of their dead, although it has "repulsed" some readers, is a vehicle that allows Read to parody the "traditional Western religious notion of the soul aspiring to rise through air to a vaporous paradise".

The manuscript was originally entitled "Inland Far", but at some point, perhaps during the gap between writing the first and subsequent parts, Read changed it to "The Green Child", which suggests that the focus of the novel changed from Olivero's quest for the source of the stream to the story of the green child herself. The original title was an allusion to William Wordsworth's ode "Intimations of Immortality", which describes the "'bright landscape' of childhood that casts its spell over later life".

Read was interested in psychoanalysis, and employed psychoanalytic theory in his work, both Freudian and Jungian, although "more as machinery than as a key to meaning". Olivero's quest for the source of the stream has been described as "travelling allegorically across a landscape of the mind", moving him "from the boundaries of the preconscious to the center of the id". To Olivero, the miller Kneeshaw represents "the evil destructive instinct which lurks beneath the civilised conventions of society", the Freudian id, whereas Olivero represents the ego. Thirty years earlier, Olivero had taught Kneeshaw at the local school, where he had seen the boy deliberately break a locomotive from a model railway that Olivero had brought into the school, by overwinding its clockwork mechanism. Unable to comprehend such wilful destruction, and already frustrated by the lack of opportunities offered by village life, Olivero left the next day. "When that spring snapped, something snapped in my mind."

Olivero's confrontation with Kneeshaw displays a Jungian psychoanalytic symbolism, as does the character of Siloēn, "the archetype of the anima, or Jungian 'soul', particularly in its function as intermediary between conscious and unconscious." Kneeshaw represents "the shadow, the dark side of man's nature, the primitive, animal part of the personality found in the personal unconscious". Jung believed that the only way to face the shadow was to acknowledge it, not to repress it as Olivero had done 30 years earlier by leaving the village.

== Autobiographical elements ==
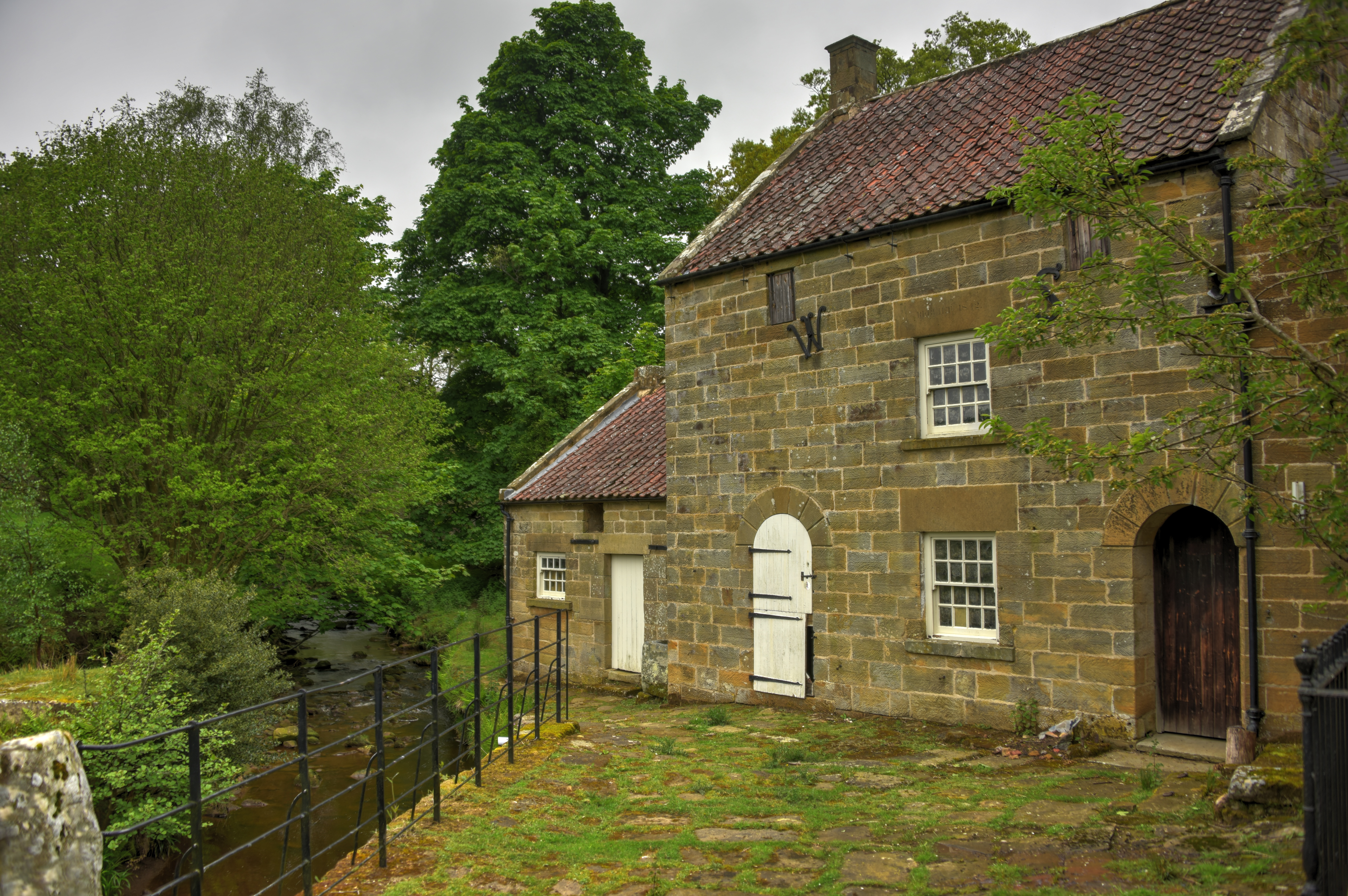
Bransdale Mill on Hodge Beck, the inspiration for the stream Olivero follows uphill to its source

During the First World War Read served with the Green Howards, fighting in the trenches of France. He was awarded the Military Cross, promoted to the rank of lieutenant, and became "obsessively determined not to betray his own men through cowardice". The novel's development of the "clearly autobiographical hero" of Olivero owes a great deal to Read's wartime experiences and the "resolute self-possession" they instilled in him. The irony of Olivero overthrowing a dictator only to become one himself is perhaps consistent with a view Read expressed in the mid-1930s: "From certain points of view, therefore, I can welcome the notion of the totalitarian state, whether in its Fascist or Communist form. I am not afraid of the totalitarian state as an economic fact, an economic machine to facilitate the complex business of living in a community."

The son of a farmer, Read was born at Muscoates Grange, about four miles (6.4 km) south of the small North Yorkshire market town of Kirkbymoorside, to which he returned in 1949. One of his favourite walks was along the course of Hodge Beck, the inspiration for the stream followed by Olivero. Hodge Beck led to a mill, which Read called his "spiritual hermitage".

The crystals carved by the workmen on the second ledge of the Green people's underground world, and contemplated by the sages on the highest ledge of all, symbolise Read's ideas about the relationship of art to nature. He believed physical form to be the "underlying principle of the universe ... the ultimate reality in a completely material cosmos. Therefore it is the quality of recurring forms that makes possible all beauty and value".

== Critical reception ==
In the words of historian David Goodway, Read's "remarkable career and formidable output have generated a surprisingly limited biographical and critical literature". Richard Wasson has commented that The Green Child "though judged favorably by the few critics and scholars who give it serious study ... is so vaguely and variously interpreted that it would seem to lack both the form and the content which justify such praise". The critic Richard E. Brown, writing in 1990, considered the work to be "an important attempt by one of [the 20th-century's] most influential English critics to integrate his wide-ranging thoughts into a complex interpretation of experience", but added that it divided commentators, appearing to some to be "fascinating but inscrutable". Reviewing the first American edition in 1948, Professor of English Robert Gorham Davis commented that the novel "baffled some English critics when it arrived in 1935", but that it was "beautifully imagined and beautifully written".

A review published in The Times shortly after the book's publication described it as a "very charming philosophical tale", and in his paper the historian and lecturer Bob Barker praised the novel for being "remarkable for its cool yet vivid style". Critic Orville Prescott, writing in The New York Times, although admitting that the novel was "beautifully written" and "a triumph of delicate and suggestive mystification", nevertheless concluded that the story was "ridiculous" and "vexatious". He ended his review with the words: "One feels constantly that shining truths are about to be revealed; that there is something important, something significant, hidden in these pages. But it is never made clear, while the ridiculous details remain all too conspicuously in view." Prescott was just as critical of Rexroth's preface to the first American edition, describing it as a "pretentious introduction of uncommon density". Writing in The Independent in 1993, shortly after the 100th anniversary of Read's birth, critic Geoffrey Wheatcroft commented that Read may not have been a great novelist "but The Green Child is the kind of book to write if you are going to leave just the one novel behind: singular, odd, completely original".

== See also ==
- 1935 in literature
