= Johan van Brosterhuysen =

Johan (Jan) van Brosterhuysen, also spelled "Brosterhuisen" (ca. 1596 (Note: His birthyear is also given as 1598.) – 1650) was a Dutch botanist, engraver, writer, and translator. At age 14 he was registered as a gownsman on 3 June 1610 at Leiden University, his native city. His interest was botany, but he was unable to acquire a teaching position in that field and took a position as secretary at Heusden Castle. Having moved to Amersfoort he became interested (under the influence of Jacob van Campen) in architecture, until his college friend Constantijn Huygens got him a position as professor of botany and literature in a newly founded academy in Breda; he was also keeper of the botanical garden. He died in Breda in September 1650.

A member of the Muiderkring, the arts and sciences coterie whose central figure was P. C. Hooft, he was known as a "dilettante" with an interest in natural philosophy (the work of Francis Bacon) and a classical scholar, and his interest in literature is proven in his scattered poems, one of which a translation of Petrarch's Sonnet 213, "Grazie ch’a pochi il ciel largo destina". He translated from English as well, and his translation of Francis Godwin's The Man in the Moone went through six printings between 1645 and 1700.

Van Brosterhuysen made a number of important friends, including people such as the humanist and theologian Caspar Barlaeus and poet P. C. Hooft, and especially Huygens, a poet and composer and secretary to princes of the House of Orange: In 1634, he was able to cure (perhaps with a botanical remedy) Huygens's wife of kidney stones, and a Latin poem by Huygens dated 1627 thanks Brosterhuysen for advising him on horticultural matters. He is credited with sixteen landscape etchings made, apparently, at Randenbroek, the country estate of artist and architect Jacob van Campen near Amersfoort. His landscapes display "with a distinctive sensibility towards trees and foliage and few indications of human presence".
