= Green children of Woolpit =

Medieval English legend

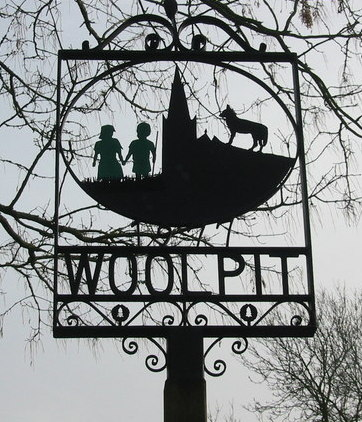
Village sign depicting the two green children of Woolpit, erected in 1977

The legend of the Green Children of Woolpit concerns two children of unusual, greenish skin who reportedly appeared in the village of Woolpit in Suffolk, England, sometime in the 12th century, possibly during the reign of King Stephen (r. 1135–1154). The children, found to be brother and sister, were of generally normal appearance except for the green colour of their skin. They spoke in an unknown language and would eat only raw broad beans. Eventually, they learned to eat other food and lost their green colour, but the boy was sickly and died around the time of his and his sister's baptism. The girl adjusted to her new life, but she was considered to be "very wanton and impudent". After she learned to speak English, the girl explained that she and her brother had come from a land where the sun never shone, and the light was like twilight. According to one version of the story, she said that everything there was green; according to another, she said it was called Saint Martin's Land.

The only near-contemporary accounts are contained in William of Newburgh's Historia rerum Anglicarum and Ralph of Coggeshall's Chronicum Anglicanum, written in about 1189 and 1220, respectively. Between then and their rediscovery in the mid-19th century, the green children seem to surface only in a passing mention in William Camden's Britannia in 1586, and in two works from the early 17th century, Robert Burton's The Anatomy of Melancholy and Bishop Francis Godwin's fantastical The Man in the Moone. Two approaches have dominated explanations of the story of the green children: that it is a folktale describing an imaginary encounter with the inhabitants of another world, perhaps subterranean or extraterrestrial, or that it presents a real event in a garbled manner. The story was praised as an ideal fantasy by the English anarchist poet and critic Herbert Read in his English Prose Style, first published in 1928, and provided the inspiration for his only novel, The Green Child, published in 1935.

== Sources ==
The village of Woolpit is in the county of Suffolk, East Anglia, about seven miles (11 km) east of the town of Bury St Edmunds. During the Middle Ages, it belonged to the Abbey of Bury St Edmunds and was part of one of the most densely populated areas in rural England. Two writers, Ralph of Coggeshall (died c. 1226) and William of Newburgh (c. 1136–1198), reported on the sudden and unexplained arrival in the village of two green children during one summer in the 12th century. Ralph was the abbot of Cistercian Coggeshall Abbey at Coggeshall, about 26 miles (42 km) south of Woolpit. William was a canon at the Augustinian Newburgh Priory, far to the north in Yorkshire. William states that the account given in his Historian rerum Anglicarum (c. 1189) is based on "reports from a number of trustworthy sources"; Ralph, writing his Chronicum Anglicanum in the 1220s, drew on the account of Sir Richard de Calne of Wykes, (Note: Richard de Calne died in or before 1188. In Thomas Keightley's translation he is named Richard de Caine.) who supposedly sheltered the children in his manor house, six miles (10 km) north of Woolpit.

While it was common for medieval chroniclers to copy others' passages verbatim—often with little or no attribution—the accounts given by the two authors differ in some details. Literary scholar Michał Madej does not believe that William or Ralph had seen the other's manuscripts when they told the story of the Green Children. He also argues that while Ralph was based approximately 40 kilometres (25 miles) from Woolpit, William "recorded it virtually from the other side of England", making it even more unlikely that the former would have had any reason to copy from the latter. Furthermore, Ralph names his sources, whereas William states he heard the tale from "unnamed persons". John Clark has suggested that it is possible that Richard de Calne was the source for both writers, and that, while William was the more distant, he was likely to have had contacts with the Augustinian Thetford Abbey. While Ralph was closer geographically, he was writing decades after William. Although William was writing relatively soon after the events depicted, Campbell has suggested that his writing is "hemmed around with doubts" as to what he is writing: although he states sum obrutus ut cogerer credere, this can translate as along the lines of "I am compelled to believe", but literally "I am crushed sufficiently that I am forced to believe it".

== Story ==
At harvest time one day during the reign of King Stephen (r. 1135–1154), according to William of Newburgh, the villagers of Woolpit discovered two children, a brother and sister, beside one of the wolf pits that gave the village its name. (Note: A wolf pit was a deep pit covered over with branches used to trap wolves.) Their skin was green, they spoke an unknown language, and their clothing was unfamiliar. Ralph of Coggeshall reports that the children were taken to the home of Richard de Calne. Ralph and William agree that the pair refused all food for several days until they came across some raw broad beans, which they consumed eagerly. The children gradually adapted to normal food and in time lost their green colour. It was decided to baptise the children, but the boy, who appeared to be the younger of the two, was sickly and died before or soon after baptism.

After learning to speak English, the children—Ralph says just the surviving girl—explained that they came from a land where the sun never shone and the light was like twilight. William says the girl called their home St Martin's Land; Ralph adds that everything there was green. According to William, the children were unable to account for their arrival in Woolpit; they had been herding their father's cattle when they heard a loud noise (according to William, it was like the sound of the bells of Bury St Edmunds Abbey) and suddenly found themselves by the wolf pit where they were found. Ralph says that they had become lost when they followed the cattle into a cave and, after being guided by the sound of bells, eventually emerged into our land.

According to Ralph, the girl was employed for many years as a servant in Richard de Calne's household, where she was considered to be "very wanton and impudent". William says that she eventually married a man from King's Lynn, about 40 miles (64 km) from Woolpit, where she was still living shortly before he wrote. Based on his research into Richard de Calne's family history, the astronomer and writer Duncan Lunan has concluded that the girl was given the name 'Agnes' and that she married a royal official named Richard Barre.

== Explanations ==
Neither Ralph of Coggeshall nor William of Newburgh explain the "strange and prodigious" event, as William calls it, and some modern historians have the same reticence: "I consider the process of worrying over the suggestive details of these wonderfully pointless miracles in an effort to find natural or psychological explanations of what 'really,' if anything, happened, to be useless to the study of William of Newburgh or, for that matter, of the Middle Ages", says Nancy Partner, author of a study of 12th-century historiography. Nonetheless, such explanations continue to be sought and two approaches have dominated explanations of the mystery of the green children. The first is that the narrative descends from folklore, describing an imaginary encounter with the inhabitants of a "fairy Otherworld". In a few early as well as modern readings, this other world is extraterrestrial, and the green children are alien beings. The second is that it is a "garbled account" of a real event, although it is impossible to be certain whether the story as recorded is an authentic report given by the children or an "adult invention". His study of the story led Charles Oman to conclude that "there is clearly some mystery behind it all, some story of drugging and kidnapping". Medievalist Jeffrey Jerome Cohen offers a different kind of historical explanation, arguing that the story is an oblique account of the racial difference between the English and the indigenous Britons.

=== Folklore ===
Twentieth-century scholars of folklore such as Charles Oman noted that one element of the children's accounts, the entry into a different reality by way of a cave, seems to have been quite popular. The medieval historian Gerald of Wales tells a similar story of a boy, a truant from school, who "encountered two pigmies who led him through an underground passage into a beautiful land with fields and rivers, but not lit by the full light of the sun". However, the specific motif that refers to the green children is poorly attested; E. W. Baughman lists it as the only example of his F103.1 category of English and North American folktale motifs: "Inhabitants of lower world visit mortals, and continue to live with them". Madej has similarly argued that the tale of the Green Children was part of a popular skein of imagination, "originating in the territories of England and Wales, that of passing through a cave to another world". (Note: Madej notes, for example, that Gervase of Tilbury—with whom Ralph of Coggeshall is known to have been acquainted—also wrote of a Derbyshire swineherd who looked for a pig in a cave, but found an Antipodean world where the seasons were the other way around.)

Martin Walsh, a scholar of folklore from around the world, identifies the story of the green children as "a garbled account of an atavistic harvest ritual". He considers the references to St Martin to be significant, and sees the story as evidence that the feast of Martinmas has its origins in an English aboriginal past, of which the children's story forms "the lowest stratum". However, John Clark questions Walsh's conclusions, arguing that there is no evidence of St Martin as "a figure with Otherworld connections", or to connect the children with "an atavistic harvest ritual". Madej connects the hypothetical St Martin's land with the saint himself, echoing Anne Witte who had previously argued for a connection between St Martin and the underworld. Medieval folklore closely associated him with symbols of death, such as his being mounted on a horse—a common psychopomp of the period—and his carrying a stick symbolising resurrection. (Note: Madej also cites Witte in support of his suggestion that "St Martin's day (11 November) is celebrated shortly after All Saints' and All Souls' Days, and additionally, at its origin there was a much older Celtic festival, also held in honor of the dead", a conclusion disputed by Clark.) He also suggests that the two children may represent, simultaneously, life and death, similarly to the near-contemporaneous tales of the Green Knight. The children's pigmentation change "would symbolise the passing from death to life, the revival occurring overground".

The eating of beans has also attracted the attention of folklorists. "It is to be noticed, too, that the habitual food of the children was beans, the food of the dead", observes K. M. Briggs. She had made the same observation about the food of the dead in her 1967 book "The Fairies in English Tradition and Literature", but John Clark casts doubt on the supposed tradition that Briggs is referring to, commenting that "an identification of beans as the food of the dead is unwarranted". However, he agrees that "beans are in many cultures associated with the dead", and Madej argues that not only had broad beans "been the symbol of death and corruption since the ancient times ... they were also associated with opposite phenomena, such as rebirth and fertility".

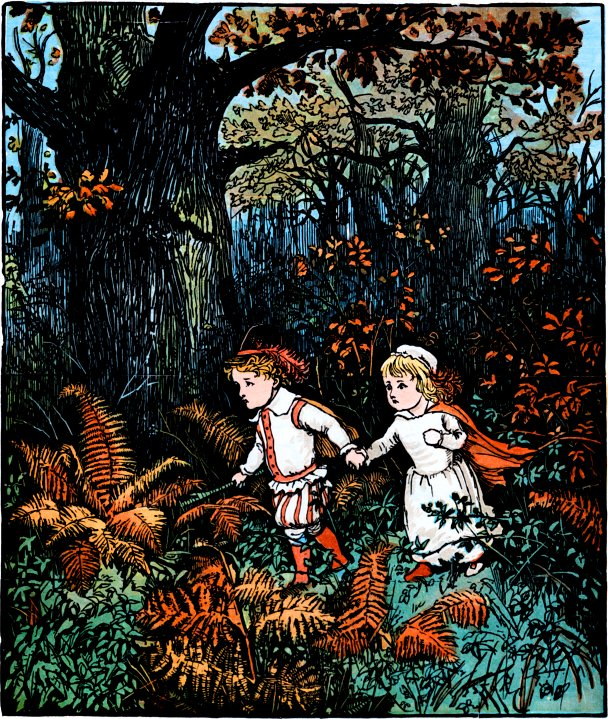
Illustration of the abandoned Babes in the Wood by Randolph Caldecott, 1879

A modern version of the tale links the green children with the Babes in the Wood. Although there are differing stories, a common motif is that they are left or taken to die in the woods—often identified as Wayland Wood or Thetford Forest—after being poisoned with arsenic by their uncle. The arsenical poisoning resulted in their colouration; they became further linked with the Woolpit children after escaping the woods, but falling into the pits before their ultimate discovery. This version of the story was known to local author and folk singer Bob Roberts, who says in his 1978 book A Slice of Suffolk "I was told there are still people in Woolpit who are 'descended from the green children', but nobody would tell me who they were!"

Other commentators have suggested that the children may have been aliens, or inhabitants of a world beneath the Earth. Robert Burton suggested in his 1621 The Anatomy of Melancholy that the green children "fell from Heaven", an idea that seems to have been picked up by Francis Godwin, historian and Bishop of Hereford, in his speculative fiction The Man in the Moone, published posthumously in 1638, which draws on William of Newburgh's account.

=== Contemporary explanations ===
In 1998 Paul Harris argued for a "down to earth" explanation of the green children in the context of 12th-century history. He identifies them as the children of Flemish immigrants, who arrived in eastern England during the early 12th century and were later persecuted after Henry II became king in 1154. He proposes that the children's homeland of "St Martin's Land" was the village of Fornham St Martin, just north of Bury St Edmunds, and suggests that their parents were Flemish clothworkers settled there. Furthermore, in 1173 Fornham was the site of the Battle of Fornham, during the civil war between King Henry II and his son "the Young King Henry". Rebel forces led by Robert de Beaumont, 3rd Earl of Leicester, together with a large number of Flemish mercenaries, had landed in Suffolk, but were defeated by royal forces on the banks of the River Lark. The Flemish mercenaries were slaughtered, and Harris suggests that there might have been violence against peaceful Flemish settlers in the area. The children may have fled and ultimately wandered to Woolpit. Disoriented, bewildered, speaking no English and dressed in unfamiliar Flemish clothes, the children would have presented a very strange spectacle to the Woolpit villagers. Harris believed that the children's colour could be explained by hypochromic anemia (also known as chlorosis or green sickness), the result of a dietary deficiency.

In a follow-up article, John Clark drew attention to some problems with Harris's use of the historical evidence, and remained unconvinced by the identification of the children as Flemings or their colour as due to green sickness. Brian Haughton describes Harris's hypothesis as "the most widely accepted explanation at present" and maintains that it "certainly suggests plausible answers to many of the riddles of the Woolpit mystery". However, he concludes that "the theory of displaced Flemish orphans ... does not stand up in many respects". For instance, he suggests it is unlikely that an educated man like Richard de Calne would not have recognised the language spoken by the children as being Flemish. Similarly, concerning green sickness, Madej counters that much of the contemporary population should probably have suffered from the same disease, and also appeared green; "the tone of green of the children's skin must have been something unprecedented and unusual."

Historian Derek Brewer's explanation is even more prosaic:

The likely core of the matter is that these very small children, herding or following flocks, strayed from their forest village, spoke little, and (in modern terms) did not know their own home address. They were probably suffering from chlorosis, a deficiency disease which gives the skin a greenish tint, hence the term "green sickness". With a better diet it disappears.

Jeffrey Jerome Cohen proposes that the story is about racial difference, and "allows William to write obliquely about the Welsh". He argues that the green children are a memory of England's past and the conquest of the indigenous Britons by the Anglo-Saxons followed by the Norman invasion. William of Newburgh—reluctantly, suggests Cohen—includes the story of the green children in his account of a largely unified, homogenous England. Cohen juxtaposes William of Newburgh's account of the green children with Geoffrey of Monmouth's The History of the Kings of Britain, a book that according to William is full of "gushing and untrammeled lying". Geoffrey's history offers accounts of previous kings and kingdoms of various ethnic identities, whereas William's England is one in which all peoples are either assimilated or pushed to the boundaries. According to Cohen, the green children represent a dual intrusion into William's unified vision of England. On one hand, they are a reminder of the ethnic and cultural differences between Normans and Anglo-Saxons, given the children's claim to have come from St Martin's Land, named after Martin of Tours; the only other time William mentions that saint is in reference to St Martin's Abbey in Hastings, which commemorates the Norman victory in 1066. But the children also embody the earlier inhabitants of the British Isles, the "Welsh (and Irish and Scots) who [had been] forcibly anglicized ... The Green Children resurface in another story that William had been unable to tell, one in which English paninsular dominion becomes a troubled assumption rather than a foregone conclusion." The boy in particular, who dies rather than become assimilated, represents "an adjacent world that cannot be annexed ... an otherness that will perish to endure".

Historians have suggested motivations for the two monastic authors. Ruch, and Gordon, have proposed episodes such as the Green Children are comments on the main historical narrative. The medievalist Catherine Clarke argues that although these stories "have often been dismissed as strange folkloric diversions or playfulness", they are not random interpolations of fantasy but actually play a central role in his overall narrative. Often a reaction to the trauma of the Anarchy, Clarke says, Newburgh's musings on the fantastic all combine the common theme of "normal experience disturbed by something which cannot be fully reached or grasped through reason". Elizabeth Freeman, commenting on Ralph's account, similarly notes that his stories "commonly treated as light entertainment, are in fact united by their treatment of a common theme", albeit one being "the threat posed by outsiders to the unity of the Christian community". Carl Watkins has commented on the demonization, literally and figuratively, of the girl in William's account, while James Plumtree has viewed the narratives as a twelfth-century historiographic digression "that permits a didactic theological exegesis".

== Publication and legacy ==
The story reappeared in the early modern period with the first printed edition of William of Newburgh's Historia rerum Anglicarum in the late 16th century. Briefly commenting on the story in 1586, William Camden considered it a hoax. A second edition of the Historia rerum Anglicarum in 1610 printed both Newburgh's and Coggeshall's texts of the story together for comparison. In contrast to Camden, however, Robert Burton—writing in 1621—asserted that not only was the story true, but that the children had fallen from the moon. This view was shared by Francis Godwin, Bishop of Hereford, around the same time in his science fiction story of a journey to the Moon The Man in the Moone, published posthumously in 1638. Madej notes that, as Godwin was writing fiction, he "did not treat the Woolpit tale with much earnestness, unlike R. Burton". Godwin makes a single specific reference to William of Newburgh, but Poole notes that "the level of detail derived from William of Newburgh's chapter on this prodigy is greater than Godwin's sole reference suggests". Clark elaborates on this, noting in particular that the lunar inhabitants have a veneration for Saint Martin similar to that attributed by the children to their homeland.

The tale resurfaced in the mid-Victorian period when the folklorist Thomas Keightley included it in The Fairy Mythology—its first publication in English.

The English anarchist poet and critic Herbert Read describes the story of the green children in his English Prose Style, first published in 1928, as "the norm to which all types of fantasy should conform". It was the inspiration for his only novel, The Green Child, published in 1935.

Author John Macklin includes an account in his 1965 book, Strange Destinies, of two green children who arrived in the Spanish village of Banjos in 1887. Many details of the story very closely resemble the accounts given of the Woolpit children, such as the name of Ricardo de Calno, the mayor of Banjos who befriends the two children, strikingly similar to Richard de Calne. It is clear that Macklin's story is an invention inspired by the green children of Woolpit, particularly as there is no record of any Spanish village called Banjos.

The green children tale was the inspiration for J. H. Prynne's 1976 poem "The Land of Saint Martin". Prynne never acknowledges this directly, however, merely alluding to it tangentially in his epigraph, a "fairly free rendering", says critic N. H. Reeve, of William of Newburgh's Latin text:

The sun does not rise upon our countrymen; our land is little cheered by its beams; we are contented with that twilight, which, among you, precedes the sun-rise, or follows the sun-set. Moreover, a certain luminous country is seen, not far distant from ours, and divided from it by a very considerable river.

Australian novelist and poet Randolph Stow uses the account of the green children in his 1980 novel The Girl Green as Elderflower; the green girl is the source for the title character, here a blonde girl with green eyes. The green children become a source of interest to the main character, Crispin Clare, along with some other characters from the Latin accounts of William of Newburgh, Gervase of Tilbury, and others, and Stow includes translations from those texts: these characters "have histories of loss and dispossession that echo [Clare's] own".

In 1996 English poet Glyn Maxwell wrote a verse play based on the story of the green children, Wolfpit (the earlier name for Woolpit), which was performed by the Cambridge University Amateur Dramatic Club at the Edinburgh Festival Fringe in that year. It has been performed more recently in New York City. In Maxwell's version the girl becomes an indentured servant to the lord of the manor, until a stranger named Juxon buys her freedom and takes her to an unknown destination.

The tale has been the basis for several 20th- and 21st-century children's books and stories, including Judith Stinton's Tom's Tale from 1983, a trilogy by Mark Bartholomew in 2006 and 2007 and The Green Children of Woolpit by J. Anderson Coats in 2019. Children's author and poet Kevin Crossley-Holland has returned to the theme several times. His book The Green Children, published in 1966, stays basically faithful to the early chroniclers. His 1994 adaptation of the story tells it from the point of view of the green girl. Fantasy/science fiction authors John Crowley (in 1981) and Terri Windling (in 1995) have both published short stories for adults based on the green children.

=== Music ===
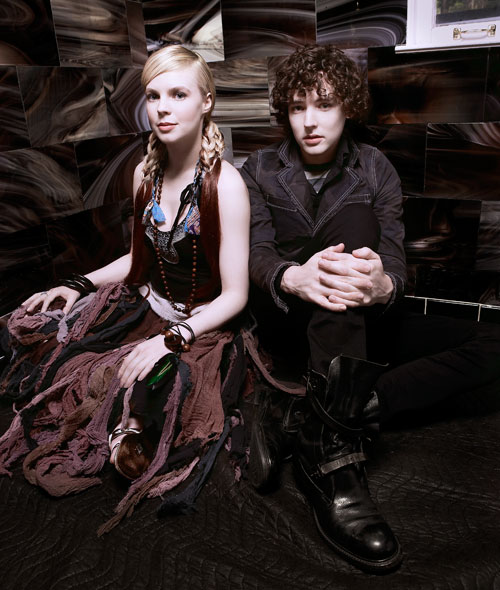
The Green Children duo in Nashville, 2009

The green children are the subject of a 1990 community opera performed by children and adults, composed by Nicola LeFanu with a libretto by Crossley-Holland. The piece features lacunae for a child orchestra to insert its own material.

An Anglo-Norwegian band, The Green Children, took their name—and that of their charity foundation—from the story. Composed of Milla Fay Sunde, from Norway, and Marlow Bevan from the UK, the band's music has been described as "atmospheric electropop".
