= William of Newburgh =

English canon and historian (1136–1198)

William of Newburgh or Newbury (Latin: Guilelmus Neubrigensis, Wilhelmus Neubrigensis, or Willelmus de Novoburgo. 1136 – 1198), also known as William Parvus, was a 12th-century English historian and Augustinian canon of Anglo-Saxon descent from Bridlington, East Riding of Yorkshire.

William experienced the Jewish pogroms in York in the late 12th century mentioning, "the slaughter was less the work of religious zeal than of bold and covetous men who wrought the business of their own greed". William also composed a lengthy Marian exposition on the Song of Songs and three sermons on liturgical texts and Saint Alban.

== History of English Affairs ==
William's major work was Historia rerum Anglicarum or Historia de rebus anglicis ("History of English Affairs"), a history of England from 1066 to 1198, written in Latin. The work is valued by historians for detailing The Anarchy under Stephen of England. It is written in an engaging fashion and still readable to this day, containing many fascinating stories and glimpses into 12th-century life. He is a major source for stories of medieval revenants, animated corpses that returned from their graves, with close parallels to vampire beliefs, and the only source for the bishop-pirate Wimund.

The 19th-century historian Edward Augustus Freeman expressed the now outdated opinion that William was "the father of historical criticism." Indeed, he was very critical of King John, whom he describes as "nature's enemy", and in general his discussion of English kings is "loyal but critical and cool".

William saw his own work as being based on reliable sources, unlike Geoffrey of Monmouth's Historia Regum Britanniae, of which Newburgh was highly critical, saying "only a person ignorant of ancient history would have any doubt about how shamelessly and impudently he lies in almost everything." He criticised Geoffrey for writing a history that conflicted with the accounts found in the writings of Bede and the church.

Because belief in souls returning from the dead was common in the 12th century, William's Historia briefly recounts stories he heard about revenants, as does the work of Walter Map, his Welsh contemporary. Although they form a minor part in each work, these folklore accounts have attracted attention within occultism. He also described the arrival of green children from "St. Martin's Land" and other mysterious, wondrous occurrences. While he says that these have an apparent signification, he does not explain what that meaning might be: "he offers these prodigious events to his readers with questions, hesitations, and doubt – with, in short, all the confessions of a critical and honest mind".

"The latest complete edition of William's history is still that found in Chronicles of the Reigns of Stephen, Henry II and Richard I. Edited by Richard Howlett. Rolls Series no. 82. London, 1884-9. Books 1-4 of William's history appear in volume 1, book 5 in volume 2."
