= TGC (musical duo) =

British-Norwegian musical duo

TGC (The Green Children)
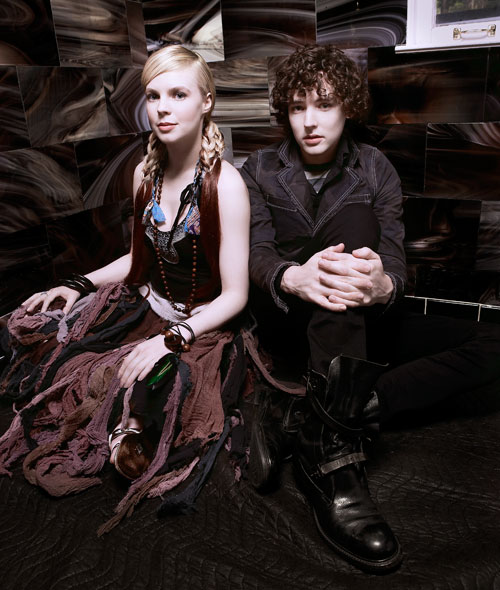
- Milla Alice and Marlow Bevan

Background information
- Origin: Norway/England
- Genre: Electropop
- Years active: 2006–present
- Labels: Knightingale Entertainment; Universal Records; Spinside Records
- Members: Milla Alice; Marlow Bevan
- Website: https://www.tgcmusic.com/

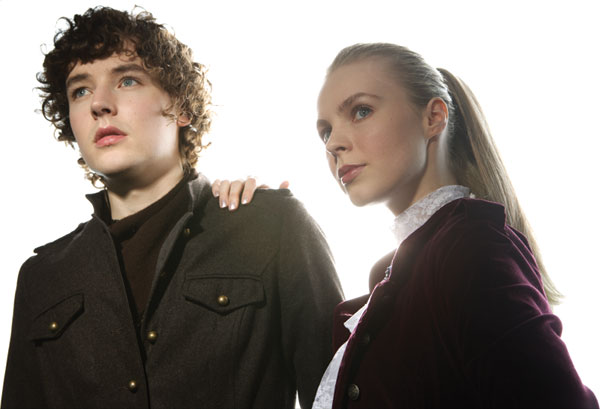
Marlow Bevan and Milla Alice

TGC (abbreviated from The Green Children) are a European musical duo, who write and self-produce atmospheric electropop music. The group consists of Milla Sunde, additionally known as Milla Alice (born 17 December 1983), from Norway, and Marlow Bevan (born on 4 October 1984) from England.

The band also established The Green Children Foundation, to support microcredit, education and healthcare.

== Career ==
=== Hear Me Now (2006) ===
In June 2006, TGC shot a music video in Bangladesh to celebrate the work of Professor Muhammad Yunus, the father of microcredit and founder of Grameen Bank.

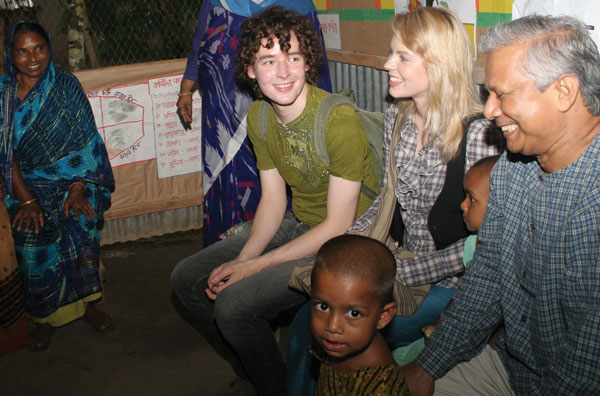
Marlow Bevan and Milla Alice, with Professor Yunus in Bangladesh

In December 2006, TGC released a fundraising CD/DVD entitled Hear Me Now throughout Norway. Through sales and donations from around the world they raised $400,000 for one of the first eye hospitals in rural Bangladesh. The hospital was opened on May 12, 2008, by TGC and Professor Muhammad Yunus, the 2006 Nobel Peace Prize winner. Yunus initiated this project with Grameen to save the sight of many of his countrymen and women.

TGC met whilst studying at the Liverpool Institute for Performing Arts and signed a major U.S. recording contract with Universal Music Group in 2008.

They left Universal in 2010 and signed a worldwide distribution deal with Los Angeles-based Spinside Records, a subsidiary of Inside Recordings, owned by legendary musician Jackson Browne. Spinside Records is distributed by Alternative Distribution Alliance and ADA Global, owned by Warner Music Group and Sub Pop Records. Their deal with Spinside Records was secured by their former manager Cheryl Bogart who worked with them in 2009/2010.

=== Encounter (2010) ===
Their first self-produced album Encounter was released in October 2010, to great critical acclaim. Rolling Stone described it as a collection of "Searching dance-pop ballads from elfin dreamers… Encounter glides by like Lady Gaga on a unicorn. Sunde gives synth-diva histrionics a mystical spritz, singing about dragons and black magic over skittering electro beats." Reema Kumari Jadeja from MOBO wrote that, "The Green Children masterfully sprinkle sincere soul and magic into a music scene that requires some much needed fantasy and romanticism... The emerald duo's debut is an audio fairytale that confiscates all grips on reality and leaves one hopelessly daydreaming."

Jackson Browne described Encounter as "A hook fueled, emotional songscape - with powerful tracks and soaring, achingly beautiful vocals."

Their first single "Dragons" was offered as a free download by Amazon.com, peaking at #3 in their 'pop' chart and at #9 overall.

Encounter Remixed was released one month later in November 2010, which included remixes from star DJs such as Paul Oakenfold and Digital Dog.

Their music was featured on the homepage of Young Hollywood, MSN, AOL, Yahoo, Amazon.com and on the iTunes Store.

In April 2011, a remix of "Life Saviour" by 7th Heaven (Kylie, Taio Cruz, Shakira) entered the Music Week UK Club charts at #17 (Pop Category).

In October 2011, 'Encounter' was nominated in the first round of voting for a U.S. Grammy Award, in two categories, 'Best New Artist' and 'Best Pop Vocal Album'. The CD was also distributed into Whole Foods Market as a part of a campaign to raise funds and awareness for micro-finance.

In April 2012, TGC produced a Remix of 'Houdini' by chart toppers Foster The People. The animated YouTube video gained 500,000 views within two weeks of its release and benefited the charity SOS Children's Villages.

=== Connection (2012-2015) ===
At the end of 2012, TGC released three songs from their upcoming second album. Critical acclaim was universally positive.

They received US radio support and their music was featured on MTV during the release.

The duo's second full-length album, Connection, was released in the US and Canada on July 23, 2013, through Amoeba Music. Fans who pre-ordered the album received autographed copies.

In November 2014, they released their single and video, "Outline". This space themed video supported the work of The Planetary Society, including partners such as Bill Nye and Yale University.

2015 saw TGC support the work of charitable organization 'New Alternatives' with a concert in NYC benefiting LGBT Homeless Youth. They were interviewed by The Huffington Post about the concert and their other charity work.

=== New songs (2015-2019) ===
On 17 July 2015, the duo released the song, "Let the Sun Shine". During the first 24 hours, the song was offered as a free download through a partnership with Unlock FM. That same day, a music video for "Let the Sun Shine" was released. In 2016, TGC released the song "Dreamers" The song received a remix by Embody; and a music video was released for that version. This video went viral, receiving over 10 Million views.

In late 2018, TGC released two songs, reportedly from their forthcoming third album. "ECG" was premiered on Clash (magazine), who wrote that "TGC make the kind of immaculate pop music you have previously only dreamed about."

The song received a warm critical response, with the music video gaining 2 million YouTube streams in the first month of release. Analogue Trash wrote that "The emotional abandon and surrender of the lyrics take hold, it would be silly indeed to resist."

The second song "Rooms" was premiered by Music Week, writing that "Rooms displays Sunde's silk vocal, warm tones atop rolling synthesizers and solid electronic percussion."

Also well received critically, EQ Music described the song as "Bathed in a beguiling mix of orchestrated strings and sonically warming synth tones…I’m certain even a celestial being, will be enchanted by Milla’s angelic, endearing voice as much as we earth humans similarly are."

A further two songs were released in 2019. The single "Echo" was premiered by Wonderland. Writing that "Milla Sunde and Marlow Bevan have a penchant for doing things a little bit differently. And this much is clear when you clock the ethereal, saccharine vocals from Sunde, whose haunting, clarity pierces through the pulsating tracks."

=== Parallels (2021) ===
TGC released their third album on July 8, 2021. Pre-ordered vinyls were offered for one week; these copies were autographed by the band.

On release day, "Parallels" was featured in Spotify’s "New Music Friday" playlist. As of October 2021, the album's songs have received over 4.2 million streams.

Flaunt magazine commented "If you love electro-pop, look no further than TGC." While Clash Magazine wrote that the music was "Shimmering with an inner light"

=== Solo project (2023) ===
In February 2023, Milla announced a new solo project under the name Milla Alice. It is unclear whether TGC will continue to release music independently.

Since 2021, Marlow Bevan has been sharing poetry to social media, and has since announced a forthcoming book.

In April 2025, the song "Dreamers" from their album "Parallels" went viral on TikTok, gaining over 2 billion views as of November 2025. The song also charted in the top 20 on Shazam’s Global Pop Chart, including a number 1 in Ukraine and multiple viral Spotify charts.

== Discography ==
=== Studio albums ===
- 2010: Encounter
- 2013: Connection
- 2021: Parallels

=== Remix albums ===
- 2010: Encounter Remixed
- 2015: The Green Children Remixed

=== Singles ===
- 2006: "Hear Me Now" (CD/DVD)
- 2009: "Hear Me Now"
- 2009: "Life Was Beautiful"
- 2010: "Dragons"
- 2011: "Can You Find Your Way"
- 2012: "Feel the Light"
- 2016: "Dreamers"

=== Music videos ===
Title	Year	Ref.
"Hear Me Now"	2006	
"Life Was Beautiful"	2009	
"Dragons"	2010	
"Black Magic"	2011	
"I Can Do Anything"	2014	
"Outline"	2014	
"Let the Sun Shine"	2015	
"Dreamers" (Embody Remix)	2016	
