= Thomas Edison in popular culture =

Thomas Edison has appeared in popular culture as a character in novels, films, comics and video games. His prolific inventing helped make him an icon and he has made appearances in popular culture during his lifetime down to the present day. He is often portrayed in popular culture as an adversary of inventor Nikola Tesla.

== Biographical works ==
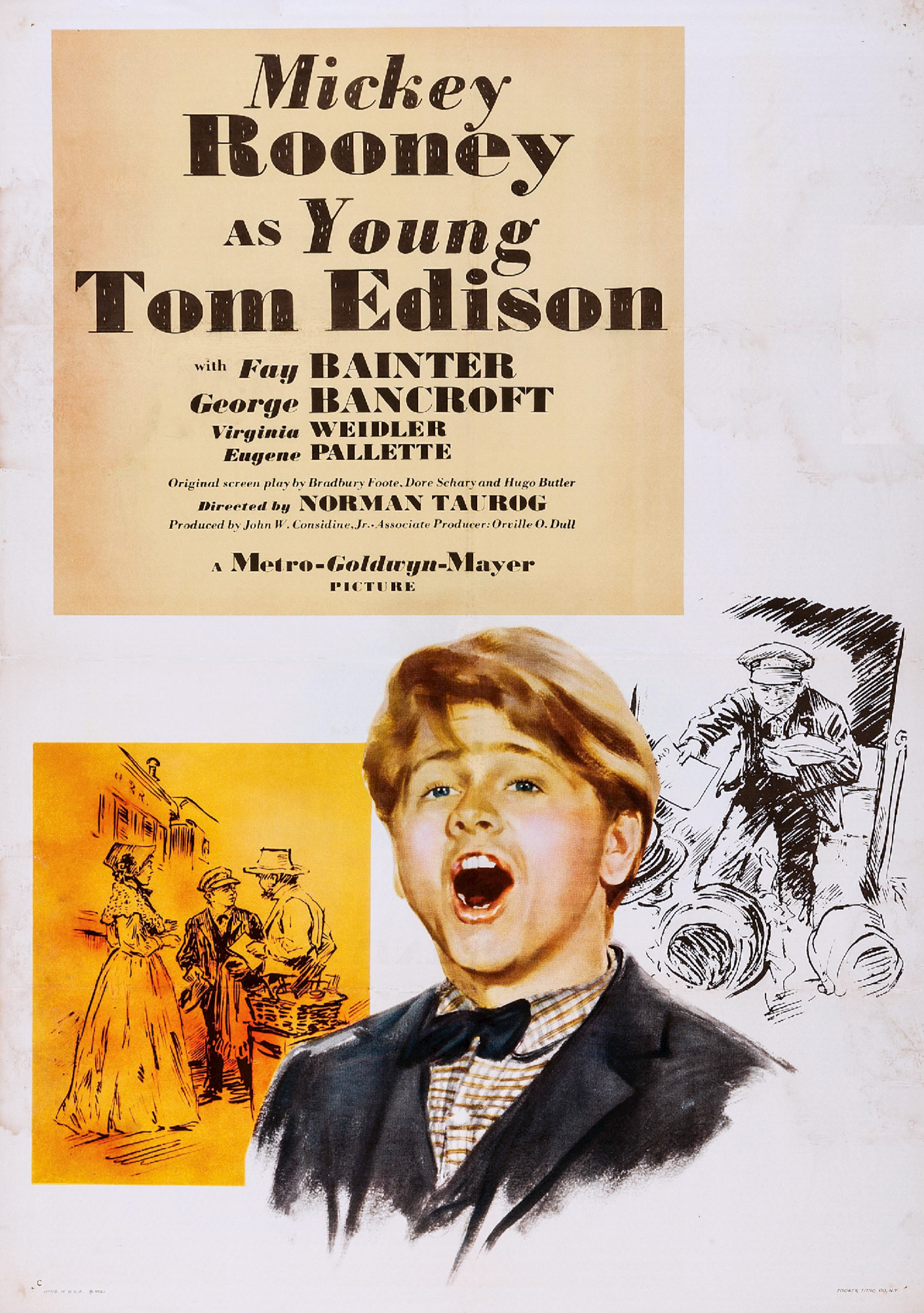
Young Tom Edison (1940), starring Mickey Rooney

- Young Tom Edison (1940), played by Mickey Rooney.
- Edison, the Man (1940), played by Spencer Tracy.
- The Life of Edison (1935–1936), radio series produced by Art Linkletter, starring David Young
- "The Electric Sunshine Man" is a musical for young voices about the life, times, and inventions of Thomas Edison; generally performed by youth choral groups in schools.
- The Schoolhouse Rock song "Mother Necessity" featured Thomas Edison first as a child intending to be an inventor when he grows up to make a lamp to help his mother see and then as a smart and rich man.
- Edison appears in caricature form on Histeria! His first major appearance was in a sketch in which he comes up with the light bulb while his nephew, played by Loud Kiddington, and his friends fool around in his office. The show features a song about Edison's partnership with Henry Ford.
- "Edison's Medicine" is a song by the band Tesla from the album Psychotic Supper, which features the war of the currents between Edison's DC and Tesla's AC.
- "The Wizard of Menlo Park" is a song by Chumbawamba on their album Un.
- The song "Edison" by the Bee Gees from their 1969 album Odessa is a reference about Thomas Edison.
- Czech poet Vítězslav Nezval wrote a lengthy epic poem titled Edison (1930), in which Edison is celebrated and apostrophed there as symbol of courage in search of meaning of life in modern civilisation. This work is considered to be one of the best poems of modern Czech literature.
- Camping with Henry and Tom, a fictional 1995 play based on Edison's camping trips with Henry Ford, written by Mark St. Germain. It was first presented at Lucille Lortel Theatre, New York.
- The Current War (2017, 2019 director's cut) is a biographical film, starring Benedict Cumberbatch as Edison.

== Fantasy and science fiction ==
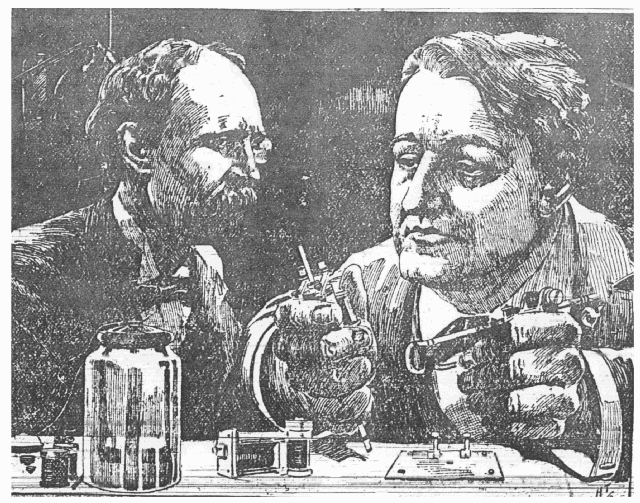
An illustration from Edison's Conquest of Mars (1898) showing Edison with a self-insert of author Garrett P. Serviss

- Edisonade is a category of fantastic fiction with young inventors travelling to distant parts and having adventures. Not only did the genre use his name, but a number of Thomas/Tom Edisons appeared in the early adventures.
- The Future Eve (L'Ève Future), an 1886 novel by Auguste Villiers de l'Isle-Adam that popularized the term "android", portrays Edison creating what he argues is the perfect woman, the android Hadaly, in order to cure his friend Lord Ewald's infatuation with a singer named Alicia, who is represented as shallow and immoral.
- Edison's Conquest of Mars by Garrett P. Serviss (1898) is an unofficial sequel to The War of the Worlds, in which Edison finds and reverse engineers Martian technology.
- "Tom Edison's Shaggy Dog" in Welcome to the Monkey House by Kurt Vonnegut (1953) is a short story about Edison's accidental discovery that dogs have superhuman intelligence (and can talk) while working on an intelligence analyzer invention. Edison's dog "Sparky" reveals that dogs keep their intelligence a closely guarded secret. The story also divulges that it was Sparky who suggested to Edison the crucial component of the first incandescent light bulb.
- And Having Writ..., a 1978 alternate universe novel by Donald R. Bensen, features four aliens stranded on Earth whose comic misadventures lead to Edison being chosen by the Republican National Committee to run for President of the United States instead of Secretary of War William Howard Taft in 1908. He wins and becomes the 27th president. Prior to becoming president, the four aliens invent an effective hearing aid to help Edison with his poor hearing. The following year in 1909, Edison has the aliens placed under house arrest in New York so that he can pry technological secrets from them. They escape (thanks to former president Theodore Roosevelt), however, and head to Europe, and Edison is obliged to dispatch Marines to go after them. When he finally has them in his clutches again, Edison realizes that the amount of technology the aliens possess would, if widely distributed, cause widespread upheaval. In 1912, Edison decides not to run for a second term as he would rather go back to inventing. He is succeeded by former president Theodore Roosevelt, who also preceded him.
- In the Japanese tokusatsu Kamen Rider Ghost (October 4, 2015 – September 25, 2016), the ghost of Thomas Edison helps the main character Takeru Tenkuji/Kamen Rider Ghost to unite the 15 Heroic Spirits, and to access his electricity/gun-wielding Edison Damashii form.
- Thomas Edison appears as an ally of Nikola Tesla in the Japanese manga series Record of Ragnarok, where he is depicted as a bishōnen with blond, curly hair, wearing a formal suit with infinity symbol buttons. Edison urges his fellow inventor to "Triumph [over the gods], and prove the pride of human science is absolute!"
- In the video game Assassin's Creed II (2009), Edison is portrayed as a member of the Knights Templar and one of the founders of Abstergo Industries, attempting to discredit Nikola Tesla, an ally of the Assassins Order.
- A Voyagers! episode involving Edison shows, in an instance of history "going wrong", Edison and his team trying to make a light bulb filament by rolling lamp black; they all fail, and when Jeffrey tears his shirt, Edison offers to repair it, then studies the thread as a potential filament.
- Back in Time With Thomas Edison is a 2001 book by Dan Gutman, wherein a 13-year-old boy named "Qwerty" Stevens discovers a secret machine built by Edison himself.
- JLA: Age of Wonder (2003) was a two-issue mini-series from DC's Elseworlds line, in which Superman landed in Kansas in the 1850s and emerged on the world stage at the 1876 Centennial Exposition. He teams up with Edison but ends up working with Tesla.
- Tales From the Bully Pulpit (2004) by Benito Cereno is a graphic novel containing the time travel adventures of Thomas Edison and Theodore Roosevelt.
- The Five Fists of Science is a 2006 graphic novel in which Edison is the villain, whose evil plans are thwarted by Nikola Tesla and Mark Twain.
- The role-playing game Fate/Grand Order has Edison appear as a Caster class Servant summoned by the Holy Grail in the E Pluribus Unum chapter, set in 1783. He works with Helena Blavatsky and Karna in fighting the Celtic takeover of the eastern United States, and is an antagonist of Geronimo's faction before becoming an ally. His feud with Tesla, who appeared earlier as an Archer class Servant, is a running joke throughout the game.
- The Doctor Who series 12 fourth episode "Nikola Tesla's Night of Terror", which aired on 19 January 2020, featured Thomas Edison, portrayed by actor Robert Glenister. Edison, who initially sabotages Tesla as a business competitor in the war of the currents, allies with the Thirteenth Doctor, her companions, and Tesla to fight off invading Skithra aliens who seek to abduct Tesla.

== Historical fiction ==
- In the Young Indiana Jones Chronicles episode "Princeton, February 1916", Indiana Jones investigates the theft of Edison's plans for an electric car. Edison is portrayed by actor Richard K. Olsen.
- The book Hey Kid, Want to Buy a Bridge? from The Time Warp Trio book series by Jon Scieszka, as well as the namesake episode from the companion television series, featured Edison as a character.
- The plot of Night of the New Magicians from the Magic Tree House book series by Mary Pope Osborne had the protagonists searching the 1889 World's Fair for four of the world's great visionaries, including Edison.

== Characters based on Edison ==
- Expiration Date (1996) by Tim Powers features a boy possessed by the spirit of Thomas Edison who is hunted through Los Angeles by people wanting to consume the ghost he carries.
- The Wizard of Oz (Oscar Diggs), from the books of the same, name is said to have been partly inspired by Thomas Edison, who author L. Frank Baum referred to as "The Wizard". His first appearance was in Baum's 1900 book The Wonderful Wizard of Oz, in which the Wizard rules the Land of Oz from the Emerald City.

== Other references to Edison ==
- Edison features in Season 2, Episode 15 of Epic Rap Battles of History in a rap battle against Nikola Tesla. The episode is titled "Nikola Tesla vs. Thomas Edison", and was posted to YouTube on March 11, 2013.
- He is one of the antagonists of the web series Super Science Friends.
- Edison appears in and lends his name to The Edison Effect, published in September 2014, the fourth Professor Bradshaw Mystery by Bernadette Pajer.
- In The Simpsons episode "The Wizard of Evergreen Terrace" (Season 10, Episode 2, which aired on September 20, 1998), Homer is inspired by Thomas Edison to become an inventor. The episode title comes from Edison's contemporary nickname, "The Wizard of Menlo Park".
- The first supervillain that Ms. Marvel (Kamala Khan) encountered in her debut solo comic series, Ms. Marvel (February 2014), was the Inventor, a clone of Edison whose DNA was contaminated with that of a cockatiel.
- In the Bob's Burgers episode "Topsy" (Season 3, Episode 16, which aired on March 10, 2013), Louise attempts to recreate the electrocution of Topsy the elephant for her science project.
- An episode of The Big Bang Theory, "The Tesla Recoil" (Season 11, Episode 8, which aired on November 16, 2017), is inspired by the apocryphal rivalry between inventors Nikola Tesla and Thomas Edison.
- Edison appears three times in the Canadian television period drama Murdoch Mysteries, in each instance portrayed by David Storch. In episode 3 of season 7 "The Filmed Adventures of Detective William Murdoch" (October 14, 2013), Edison is protective of a patent related to sound film. In episode 8 of season 8 "High Voltage" (December 1, 2014), both Edison and Thomas Edison Jr., portrayed by Scott Beaudin, feature. In episode 11 of season 13 "Staring Blindly into the Future" (January 13, 2020), Edison is upset that apparently he is not an important enough scientist to be kidnapped. Edison is mentioned in the series pilot "Power" (January 20, 2008), in which Nikola Tesla features prominently. A version of Edison's talking doll is a key element of episode 11 of season 5 "Murdoch in Toyland" (May 8, 2012) and Edison's steel-nickel battery exhibited at the 1904 St. Louis World's Fair is mentioned in episode 8 of season 10 "Excitable Chap" (December 5, 2016).

=== Philately ===
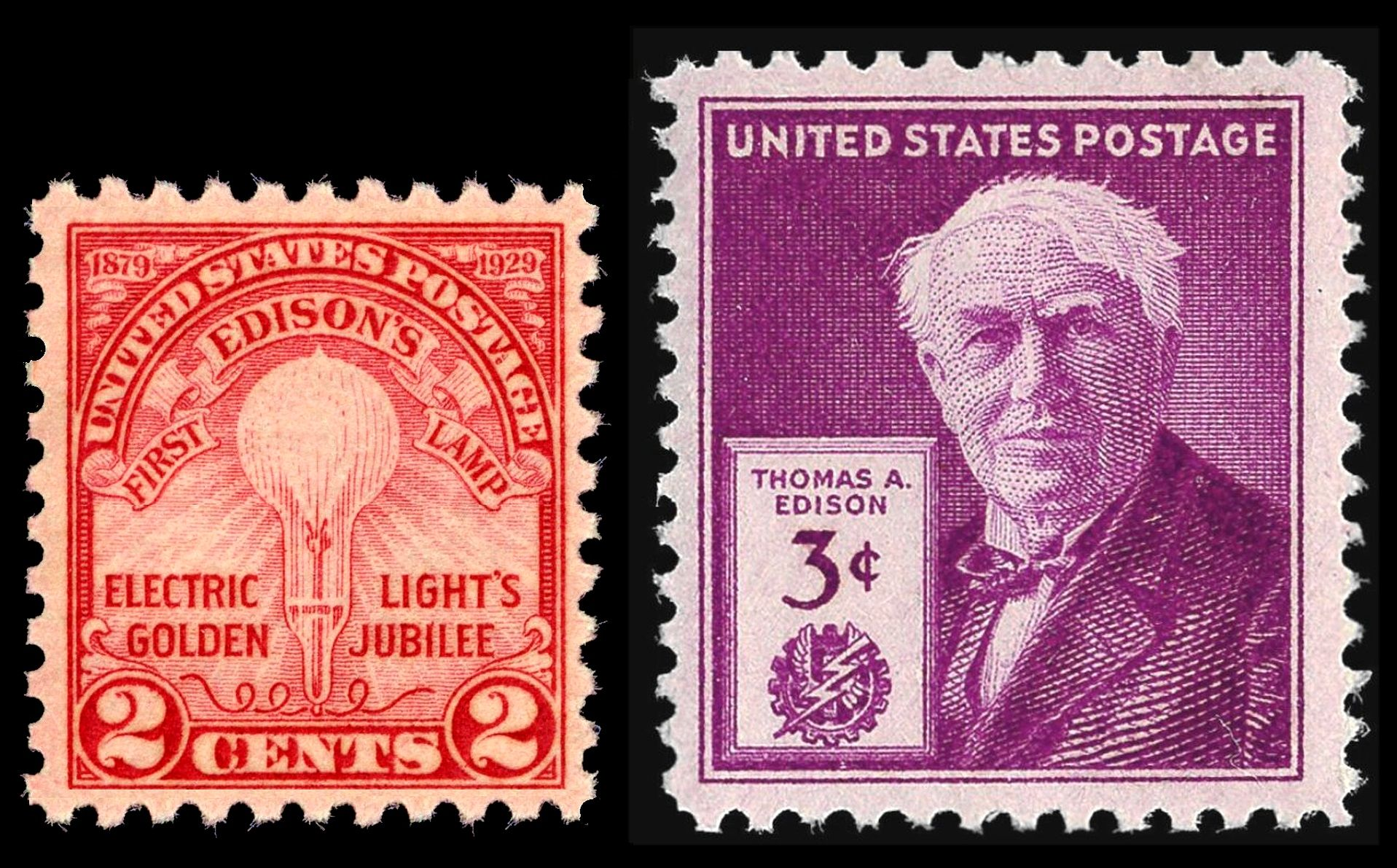
Thomas Edison issues of 1929 and 1947

Thomas Edison has been honored twice with two different U.S. postage stamps. The first was released in 1929 at Menlo Park, NJ, two years before his death; a 2-cent red, on the 50th anniversary of his invention of the incandescent light, and again in 1947, 3-cent violet, on the 100th anniversary of his birth, first released in Milan, Ohio, his place of birth.

== See also ==
- Category:Cultural depictions of scientists
