= Pajer =

Pajer is a surname. Notable people with the surname include:

- Adam Pajer (born 1995), Czech footballer
- Bernadette Pajer (fl. from 2001), American author
- Ivica Pajer (1934–2006), Yugoslavian-born Croatian actor
