= Bully pulpit (disambiguation) =

Bully pulpit is a conspicuous position that provides an opportunity to speak out and be listened to.

Bully pulpit may also refer to:

- The Bully Pulpit, a 2013 book by Doris Kearns Goodwin
- Tales from the Bully Pulpit, a comic book
- Bully Pulpit Games, a company
- Bully Pulpit Golf Course, a golf course in North Dakota
