= List of Tick-related published material =

This article contains a list of the published material where The Tick has appeared.

== New England Comics Newsletter ==
The Tick's first appearance was in a one-page comic adventure in the in-house newsletter for New England Comics. He eventually appeared in a total of three issues.

- NEC Newsletter 14, July–August 1986
- NEC Newsletter 15, September–October 1986
- NEC Newsletter 16, November–December 1986

== Comic book ==
The first regular series of Tick comics was released in black and white. The first two issues were labeled special editions and were released in limited copies. Every issue of the original series have been re-released in subsequent printings, with some reaching as many as ten editions. After completing the first 12 issues of this series, Ben Edlund left to work on the Fox animated Tick show.

- The Tick 1, Special Edition, March 1988, limited to 5000 copies.
- The Tick 1, June 1988
- The Tick 2, Special Edition, "High Rise Hijinx," June 1988, limited to 3000 copies.
- The Tick 2, "High Rise Hijinx," September 1988
- The Tick 3, "Night of a Million-Zillion Ninja," December 1988
- The Tick 4, "A Big Fight," April 1989
- The Tick 5, "Early Morning of a Million Zillion Ninjas," August 1989
- The Tick 6, "Villains, Inc." November 1989
- The Tick 7, "Spoon!" February 1990
- The Tick 8, "A Matter of Cosmic Import....and Other Stories....." July 1990
- The Tick 9, "Road Trip," March 1991
- The Tick 10, "Some Obstacles and a Partial Resolution," October 1991
- The Tick 11, "Two Strange Warm Men and the City of Their Dreams," August 1992
- The Tick 12, "One Man's Treasure...is Also Another Man's Treasure," May 1993

=== Special issues from the original series ===
There have been several special issues of the original series that have been released.

- The Tick 1, Special Edition Reprise was released in June 1996 and was limited to 10000 copies.
- The Tick 2, Special Edition Reprise was released in July 1996 and was limited to 3000 copies.

In August 1996, New England Comics released an entire run of 10th anniversary editions of the entire series. Each issue's edition is listed below.

- The Tick 1, 8th edition
- The Tick 2, 7th edition
- The Tick 3, 7th edition
- The Tick 4, 7th edition
- The Tick 5, 4th edition
- The Tick 6, 5th edition
- The Tick 7, 4th edition
- The Tick 8, 4th edition
- The Tick 9, 3rd edition
- The Tick 10, 3rd edition
- The Tick 11, 3rd edition
- The Tick 12, 3rd edition

In addition, a 5th anniversary issue of The Tick 4 (4th edition) was released in October 1991.

The Tick Black and Red The Proto Comic (AKA the Tick Ashcan) was released in 1990, as a Proto-Tick addition to the series.

There is a rare edition of The Tick 2, 1st edition with a non-diecut cover. This was a mistake in the printing process rather than a planned release.

A first edition of The Tick 8 without the Tick logo on the cover.

Four variant covers of the first edition of The Tick 12, without logo and each with a different illustration on the back cover.

The Tick: The Pseudo Edition 13, released November 2000. After many years of waiting for Ben Edlund to release a promised conclusion to the series, this issue was finally put out by other individuals within NEC.

=== Original Series Trade Paperbacks ===
- Tick Omnibus 1, August 1990, collects issues 1-6.
- Tick Omnibus 2, June 1992, collects issues 7-10.
- Tick Omnibus 3, "THVRSDAY AD INFINTVM," April 1996 collects issues 11-12.
- Tick Bonanza 1, August 1999, collects issues 1-3.
- Tick Bonanza 2, August 1999, collects issues 4-6.
- Tick Bonanza 3, August 1999, collects issues 7-9.
- Tick Bonanza 4, August 1999, collects issues 10-12.

The Tick Omnibus 1 & 2 have gone through several printings. In addition a 3000 copy limited edition of Tick Omnibus #1 was released at the same time as the original.

The Tick Omnibus 3 includes a special Tick gallery of drawings by Ben Edlund and a preview of the long-awaited issue 13.

== Chroma-Tick ==
Chroma-Tick recreates the first nine issues of the original series in color.

- Chroma-Tick 1, Special edition, February 1992
- Chroma-Tick 2, Special edition, June 1992
- Chroma-Tick 3, August 1992
- Chroma-Tick 4, October 1992
- Chroma-Tick 5, October 1993
- Chroma-Tick 6, June 1993
- Chroma-Tick 7, September 1993
- Chroma-Tick 8, November 1993
- Chroma-Tick 9, January 1994

Chroma-Tick number 4 was released with three presidential election themed covers: Bush Re-elected in Upset, Perot wins in Shocker and Clinton by Landslide. A trade paperback entitled The Naked City and which collected Chroma-Tick 1-6 was released in June 1996. A second edition of The Naked City was released May 1998.

== Karma Tornado ==
The Tick: Karma Tornado was a series of short episodes unrelated to the original series. Each issue has gone through two printings.

- Tick: Karma Tornado 1, October 1993
- Tick: Karma Tornado 2, December 1993
- Tick: Karma Tornado 3, May 1994
- Tick: Karma Tornado 4, July 1994
- Tick: Karma Tornado 5, August 1994
- Tick: Karma Tornado 6, October 1994
- Tick: Karma Tornado 7, November 1994
- Tick: Karma Tornado 8, December 1994
- Tick: Karma Tornado 9, March 1995

The second editions of Tick: Karma Tornado issues 3-6 each included a flip book numbered Tick’s Back -4 to -1. These were followed by the Tick’s Back issue 0, released in August 1997 which served as a prelude to Tick: Big Blue Destiny. Issue 0 was released with four variant covers: a red cover, green cover, gold cover and gold cover with no logo.

=== Karma Tornado Trade Paperbacks ===
- Tick: Karma Tornado Trade Paperback 1, October 1995, collecting issues 1-5.
- Tick: Karma Tornado Trade Paperback 2, April 1996, collecting issues 6-9.
- Tick: Karma Tornado Bonanza 1, September 1999, collecting issues 1-3,
- Tick: Karma Tornado Bonanza 2, September 1999, collecting issues 4-6.
- Tick: Karma Tornado Bonanza 3, September 1999, collecting issues 7-9.

== Tick Big Blue Destiny ==
- The Tick: Big Blue Destiny, Ashcan Edition, July 1997
- The Tick: Big Blue Destiny 1, October 1997
- The Tick: Big Blue Destiny 2, December 1997
- The Tick: Big Blue Destiny 3, March 1998
- The Tick: Big Blue Destiny 4, April 1998
- The Tick: Big Blue Destiny 5, July 1998

The Tick: Big Blue Destiny, Ashcan edition was also released with a no-logo variant cover. Issue 1 was issued with three variant covers. Issues 2 and 4 were released with two variant covers each.

=== Big Blue Destiny Trade Paperbacks ===
- The Tick: Big Blue Destiny Bonanza 1, June 1999, collecting issues 1-2.
- The Tick: Big Blue Destiny Bonanza 2, June 1999, collecting issues 3-5.

== Tick: Luny Bin ==
- The Tick: Luny Bin Preview 0 Ashcan, July 1998
- The Tick: Luny Bin 1, August 1998
- The Tick: Luny Bin 2, October 1998
- The Tick: Luny Bin 3, December 1998

The Tick: Luny Bin Preview was released with three variant covers. Luny Bin 0-3 were subtitled Big Blue Destiny 6-9, respectively. A trade paperback entitled The Tick Luny Bin Bonanza Edition and which collected The Tick Luny Bin 1-3 was released in August 1999.

== Holiday and One-Shot Specials ==
Many of the one-shot specials in this list had its own self-inclusive storyline, although some of the later ones were more serial in nature.

- Tick Big Yule Log Special, December 1997
- Tick Big Romantic Adventure 1, February 1998
- Tick Big Summer Fun Special, August 1998
- Tick Big Back to School Special, October 1998
- Tick Big Yule Log Special 1999, December 1998
- Tick Big Summer Annual 1, July 1999
- Tick Big Halloween Special 1, October 1999
- Tick Big Yule Log Special 2000, November 1999, Ashcan edition
- Tick Big Yule Log Special 2000, November 1999
- Tick Big Year 2000 Spectacle 1, March 2000
- Tick Big Mother’s Day Special 1, April 2000
- Tick Big Tax Time Terror 1, April 2000
- Tick Big Father’s Day Special 1, June 2000
- Tick Massive Summer Double Spectacle 1, July 2000
- Tick Massive Summer Double Spectacle 2, August 2000
- Tick Big Cruise Ship Vacation Special 1, September 2000
- Tick Big Halloween Special 2000, October 2000
- Tick Big Yule Log Special 2001, December 2000
- The Tick Incredible Internet Comic 1, July 2001. This was a compilation of episodes of the Tick that originally appeared exclusively on the NEC internet website.
- Tick Big Halloween Special 2001, September 2001
- Tick Big Red-N-Green Christmas Spectacle 1, December 2001
- Introducing the Tick 1, April 2002.
- Tick Big Xmas Trilogy 1, December 2002
- Tick Big Xmas Trilogy 2, December 2002
- Tick Big Xmas Trilogy 3, December 2002

The 1997 issue of the Tick Big Yule Log Special was released with two variant covers. The 2000 issue of the Tick Big Yule Log Special was released with three variant covers.

The Tick Massive Summer Double Spectacle 1 and 2, along with the regular edition, were both also released with a special edition and a limited edition. Each cover of the special and limited editions featured photos of the characters from the live action version of the Tick.

== Tick and Arthur ==
- The Tick and Arthur 1, February 1999
- The Tick and Arthur 2, April 1999
- The Tick and Arthur 3, June 1999
- The Tick and Arthur 4, August 1999
- The Tick and Arthur 5, October 1999
- The Tick and Arthur 6, December 1999

The Tick and Arthur 1 also came in a no-logo variant cover.

=== Tick and Arthur Trade Paperbacks ===
- Tick and Arthur Bonanza 1, May 2000, collecting issues 1-3.
- Tick and Arthur Bonanza 2, June 2000, collecting issues 4-6.

== Heroes of the City ==
- The Tick: Heroes of the City 1, February 1999
- The Tick: Heroes of the City 2, March 1999
- The Tick: Heroes of the City 3, May 1999
- The Tick: Heroes of the City 4, July 1999
- The Tick: Heroes of the City 5, September 1999
- The Tick: Heroes of the City 6, January 2002

The Tick: Heroes of the City 1 also came in a no-logo variant cover.

=== Heroes of the City Trade Paperbacks ===
- Tick Heroes of the City Bonanza 1, May 2000, collecting issues 1-3.
- Tick Heroes of the City Bonanza 2, May 2000, collecting issues 4-6.

== Tick in Color ==
- The Tick in Color 1, Jan 2001
- The Tick in Color 2, March 2001
- The Tick in Color 3, May 2001
- The Tick in Color 4, August 2001
- The Tick in Color 5, October 2001
- The Tick in Color 6, January 2002

The Tick in Color 1 was released with four variant covers.

== Tick & Artie ==
In this series, Tick and Arthur are actually real insects. Tick and Artie originally appeared as shorts in The Tick in Color series.

- Tick & Artie 1, June 2002
- Tick & Artie 2, October 2002

== Tick Golden Age Comics ==
The Golden Age series imagines the Tick as he would have appeared in the early days of comic books and puts him in such scenarios as fighting the Nazis in World War II and as a cynical gumshoe. Each issue was released with two variant covers.

- Tick Golden Age 1, May 2002
- Tick Golden Age 2, July 2002
- Tick Golden Age 3, December 2002

A Trade Paperback entitled the Tick Golden Age Giant Edition and which collects issues 1-3 has also been released.

== Days of Drama ==
- Days of Drama 1, July 2005
- Days of Drama 2, September 2005
- Days of Drama 3, November 2005
- Days of Drama 4, January 2006
- Days of Drama 5, May 2006
- Days of Drama 6, June 2006

Days of Drama 1 and 6 have each been released with two variant covers.

== Circus Encyclopedias ==
The Circus series is an encyclopedia of the Tick universe, featuring descriptions of all characters who have appeared in the various series of Tick comics. The original series released in 1992-93 was updated in 2000.

- Tick’s Giant Circus of the Mighty 1, Summer 1992, covers entries A-O.
- Tick’s Giant Circus of the Mighty 2, Summer 1992 covers entries P-Z.
- Tick’s Giant Circus of the Mighty 3 Fall 1993, Update of 1 & 2.
- Circus Maximus 1, March 2000, covers letters A-D.
- Circus Maximus 2, April 2000 covers letters E-M.
- Circus Maximus 3, May 2000 covers letters N-S.
- Circus Maximus 4, June 2000 covers letters T-Z.
- Circus Maximus Redux, 21st Century Update 1, April 2001

A trade paperback collecting Tick's Giant Circus of the Mighty 1-3 was released as Tick Omnibus 4 in April 1996.

== Spinoffs ==
=== Paul the Samurai ===
- Paul the Samurai, Limited Series 1, October 1990
- Paul the Samurai, Limited Series 2, July 1991
- Paul the Samurai, Limited Series 3, December 1991
- Paul the Samurai 1, July 1992
- Paul the Samurai 2, September 1992
- Paul the Samurai 3, October 1992
- Paul the Samurai 4, February 1993
- Paul the Samurai 5, April 1993
- Paul the Samurai 6, July 1993
- Paul the Samurai 7, September 1993
- Paul the Samurai 8, November 1993
- Paul the Samurai 9, March 1994
- Paul the Samurai 10, May 1994

==== Paul the Samurai Trade Paperbacks ====
- Collected Paul the Samurai, June 1992, collects the Limited Series issues 1-3
- Paul the Samurai Bonanzai 1, May 1996, collects Paul the Samurai issues 1-4.
- Paul the Samurai Bonanzai 2, December 1996, collects Paul the Samurai issues 5-8.

=== Man-Eating Cow ===
- Man-Eating Cow 1, July 1992
- Man-Eating Cow 2, November 1992
- Man-Eating Cow 3, January 1993
- Man-Eating Cow 4, April 1993
- Man-Eating Cow 5, June 1993
- Man-Eating Cow 6, August 1993
- Man-Eating Cow 7, November 1993
- Man-Eating Cow 8, January 1994
- Man-Eating Cow 9, April 1994
- Man-Eating Cow 10, June 1994

==== Man-Eating Cow Trade Paperbacks ====
- Man-Eating Cow Bonanza 1, April 1996, collects issues 1-4.
- Man-Eating Cow Bonanza 2, December 1996, collects issues 5-8.

A trade paperback collecting Paul the Samurai 9-10 and Man-Eating Cow 9-10 was released as Tick Omnibus 5 in June 1996.

=== Chainsaw Vigilante ===
- Chainsaw Vigilante 1, September 1993
- Chainsaw Vigilante 2, November 1993
- Chainsaw Vigilante 3, March 1994

Chainsaw Vigilante 1 was released with a silver foil stamped cover and came with three rare variant covers. A Chainsaw Vigilante Trade Paperback entitled Chainsaw Vigilante Bonanza was released in December 1996. This comic was originally supposed to run 6 issues. It was stopped after three issues due to poor sales.

== The Tick New Series ==
A bimonthly Tick series which began publication in December 2009, written by Benito Cereno with art by Les McClaine. Issues 1-8 of the new series have been released as of 2011.

== The Tick Meets...(100 Series) ==
Starting with the epic 100th (collective) issue of the Tick (released summer 2012), a new crossover with a popular indie comic superhero is featured per issue. Issue #100 saw the Tick team up with Invincible, while issue #101 (released October 2012) found the Tick meeting Madman. In 2014, an extremely limited edition NEC Comic-Con issue was released, only 750 copies of which were produced.

== The Tick Free Comic Book Day series ==
Starting in 2010, NEC has released one Free Comic Book Day (first Saturday in May) helping of The Tick almost every year, excluding 2012. The FCBD Tick issue of 2010 was a colored reprint of Ben Edlund's The Tick #1 from the original run, which was also printed as a free Halloween ComicFest issue in 2017. All new stories of The Tick appeared as FCBD issues in 2011, skipping 2012, and from 2013 onward (http://tickcomics.com/fcbd.html). As of the typing of this article, an issue of The Tick FCBD for 2020 has been announced on Free Comic Book Day's official website, complete with a 6 page preview (https://www.freecomicbookday.com/Catalog/JAN200034). The Tick's FCBD series seems to have light continuity between the short stories. In the 2011 FCBD The Tick issue, Tick references that time he "kicked a moon," potentially referencing The Tick #100 that would not be released until the following year of March 28, 2012, potentially putting the FCBD series chronologically after that uncompleted story arc.

== Other comic book appearances of the Tick ==
A short Tick adventure appeared in the Independent Comic Book Sampler 2, released in 1988.

The Tick appeared in the first issue of Tales Too Terrible to Tell 1, also published by New England Comics, released Winter 1989-90.

Ben Edlund drew a two-page comic strip for Fox Totally Kids magazine in the Spring 1994 issue to promote The Tick animated series.

The Tick made a cameo appearance in Shi/Cyblade 1, released September 1995.

The Tick made a cameo appearance in the daily comic strip Luann as Luann's brother, Brad, contemplates several of his favorite super-heroes.

The Tick is referenced in an issue of Deadpool. Deadpool leaps from a plane to attack Hulk and screams a nonsensical phrase. He then jokingly asks the readers if they were expecting him to say Spoon (the Tick's catchphrase).

== Books ==
- Tick Mighty Blue Justice, May 1997, published by Boulevard Books
- The Tick: Six Action-Packed Adventures, by Clay Griffith, 1994, published by Skylark Books.
- The Tick: Seven More Exciting Adventures!, by Clay Griffith, 1995, published by Skylark Books.
- Tick A World of Paint, Fox Kids Funhouse, volume 1, no 1, 1997
- Tick Raw Uncooked Justice, Fox Kids Funhouse, volume 1, no 2, 1997

== Sources ==
- The Tick Circus Maximus #4, June, 2000, New England Comics Press
- New England Comics Website
