= Moon Maiden =

Moon Maiden may refer to:

- Moon Maiden (character), DC Comics superhero
- The Moon Maiden, a 1978 novel by Garrett P. Serviss
- The Moon Maiden, an opera by Rutland Boughton
- Moon Maiden, a 1679 depiction of and nickname for the lunar mountain Promontorium Heraclides

== See also ==
- Moon Maid (disambiguation)
- List of lunar deities
