= Edison's Conquest of Mars =

1898 novel by Garrett P. Serviss

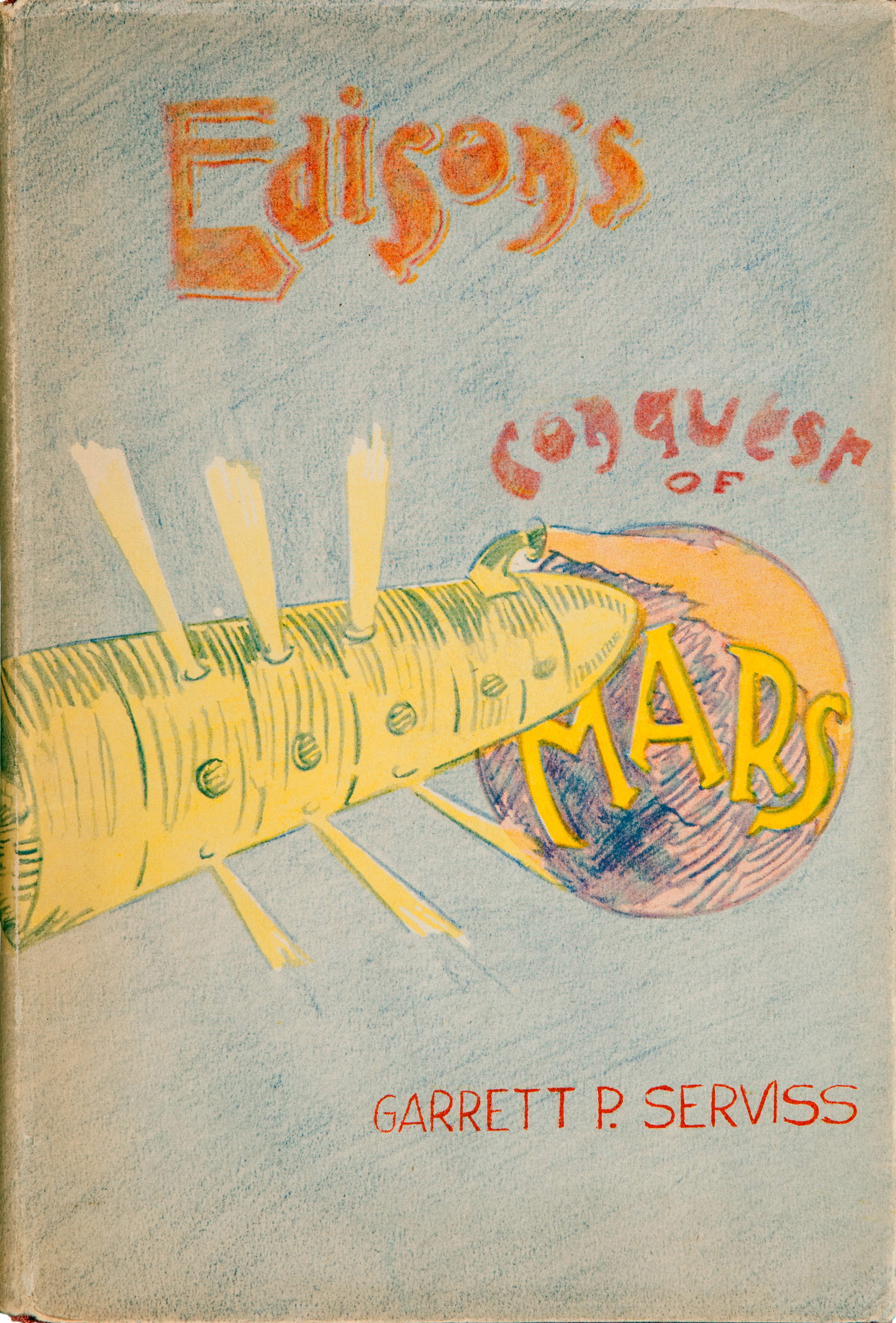
- Dust-jacket from the first book publication
- Author: Garrett P. Serviss
- Illustrator: Bernard Manley Jr.
- Cover artist: Russell Swanson
- Language: English
- Genre: Science fiction Invasion literature Space opera
- Publisher: Carcosa House
- Publication date: 1947 (book edition); Magazine serial 1898
- Publication place: United States
- Media type: Print (hardback)
- Pages: xxiii, 186
- OCLC: 2494245
- Dewey Decimal: 813.49
- LC Class: PZ3.S4925 PS3537 .E68
- Preceded by: Fighters from Mars

Edison's Conquest of Mars is an 1898 science fiction novel by American astronomer and writer Garrett P. Serviss. It was written as a sequel to Fighters from Mars, an unauthorized and altered version of H. G. Wells's 1897 novel The War of the Worlds. It has a place in the history of science fiction for its early employment of themes and motifs that later became staples of the genre.

== Overview ==
The book features Thomas Edison as the primary character, though neither Edison nor H. G. Wells were involved in its creation (although the 2010 edition published by Apogee Books of Canada includes the credit "written in collaboration with Edison"). Set after the devastating Martian attack in the previous story, the novel depicts Edison leading a group of scientists to develop ships and weapons, including a disintegration ray, for the defence of Earth. Edison and company fight the aliens in space and on Mars. He eventually causes a flood that defeats the enemy and forces an end to hostilities.

Serviss wrote himself into the story as a professor whom Edison consults; also appearing are scientists such as Edward Emerson Barnard, Lord Kelvin, Wilhelm Röntgen and Silvanus P. Thompson, and heads of state such as Queen Victoria, U.S. President William McKinley, Kaiser Wilhelm II and Emperor Mutsuhito.

== Plot ==
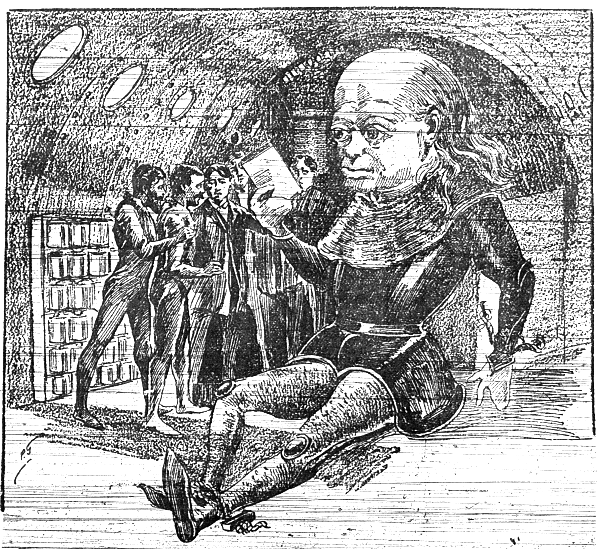
Martian prisoner, teaching the Earthmen their language. 1898 illustration by G. Y. Kauffman.

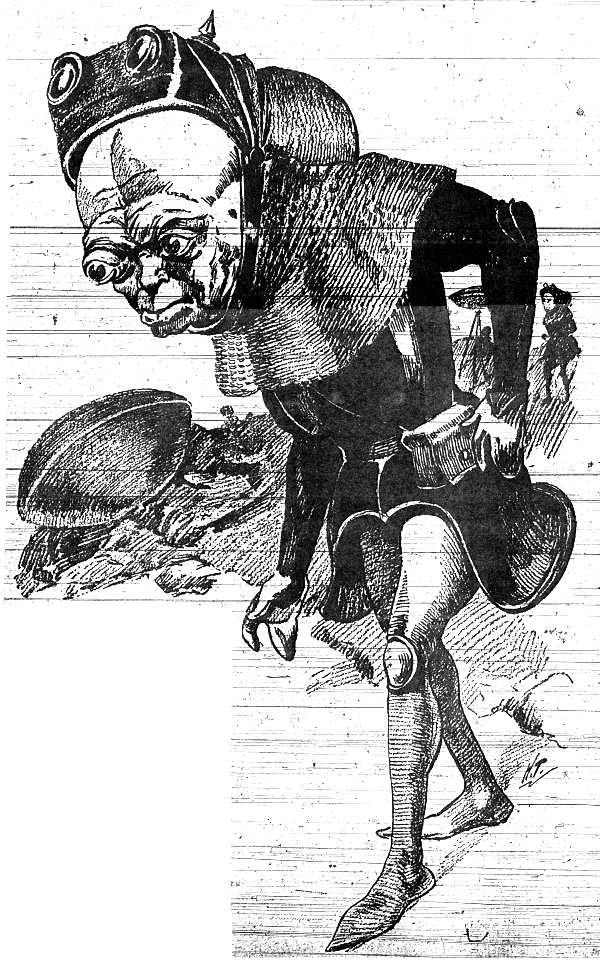
"Like men, and yet not like men; combining the human and the beast in their appearance, it required a steady nerve to look at them.... In our eyes their moral character shone through their physical aspect and thus rendered them more terrible!"

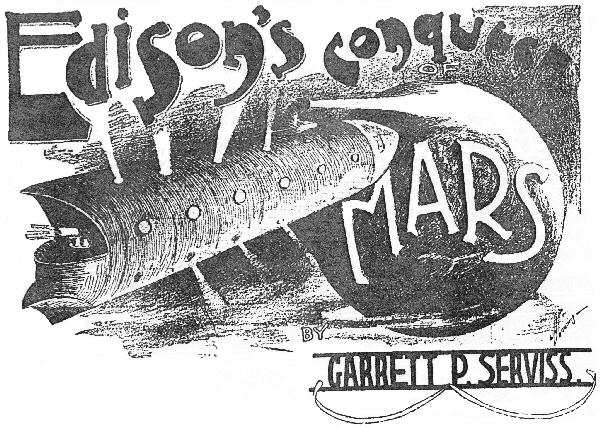
1898 illustration by G. Y. Kauffman

The book is set following the abortive Martian attack depicted in Fighters from Mars, much more devastating and global than in H. G. Wells' The War of the Worlds, though in both works the onslaught is thwarted when the aliens die from bacterial illness. Determining that the Martians will inevitably return, Earth's leaders, including U.S. President William McKinley, Queen Victoria, Kaiser Wilhelm II, and Emperor Mutsuhito, unite the world against the common threat and plan an attack on Mars. American inventor Thomas Edison leads a group of scientists studying derelict Martian equipment; they are able to develop an anti-gravity device powered by electric repulsion as well as a disintegration ray.

Using this new technology, the allies construct an armada of space ships for the attack. Edison takes some ships to the Moon on a test run; using the first known fictional depiction of space suits. There the explorers uncover evidence of an extinct civilization of giants. The armada heads on, discovering a solid gold asteroid being mined by the Martians. The humans fight two space battles against the Martians, suffering heavy casualties but ultimately winning thanks to the superiority of Edison's ray gun compared to the Martians' electric weapons. The humans take a captive, from whom they learn the Martian language.

The humans reach Mars, but in spite of their superior forces they have lost half their men to the Martians' overwhelming numbers. The Martians envelop the planet in a smoke screen, and the humans retreat to the moon Deimos. During a raid on Mars for supplies, the earth men find Aina, the last of a population of human slaves whose ancestors were captured from Kashmir in a Martian raid 9,000 years before. During this raid, the Martians also constructed the Great Pyramids and the Great Sphynx in Egypt, the latter of which is a statue of their leader. Aina advises Edison that meeting the Martians in battle would be fruitless, and that they should instead attack the dams that channel water from the polar ice. Since most of Mars' cities are under sea level, the flood spreads rapidly, killing most of the Martians and destroying their civilization. Edison and company force a peace with the surviving Martians, and return home to great celebration.

== Aliens ==
There are three type of aliens in the book.

The Martians in this version are not like the squid-like Martians described in H. G. Wells's story. These Martians are more humanoid with arms, legs and an enormous head with projector-like eyes and bad looking faces. When they rise, they are 15 feet (4.6 meters) high. However this is only the male, for the species exhibits sexual dimorphism. To Earthlings, they appear unpleasant. The Martian women, however, are graceful and beautiful.

The residents of Ceres are at war with the Martians. However, they are only mentioned, except for a female slave who is 40 feet tall. The "Cerenites" are this height due to the reduced gravity of their world.

When Edison's men land on the Moon, they discover that the Moon was, at one point, capable of supporting life. Only a giant footprint is seen, leaving the reader (and the characters) wondering what was once there.

== Legacy ==
Serviss' first attempt at fiction, the book was published serially in the New York Journal. Serviss went on to write other science fiction stories, arguably making him the first American to write science fiction professionally. An early example of what would later be called space opera, Edison's Conquest of Mars was also a particularly literal "Edisonade". The book contains some notable "firsts" in science fiction: spacesuits (called "air-tight suits"), aliens building the Pyramids, space battles, oxygen pills, asteroid mining and disintegrator rays.

Rocket scientist Robert H. Goddard read both Edison's Conquest of Mars and Fighters from Mars and credited them with helping form his early interest in developing rockets for interplanetary exploration.

Edward Guimont has argued that Edison's Conquest of Mars was an influence on author H. P. Lovecraft's Cthulhu Mythos, particular with its use of the ancient alien tropes of massive alien-built ruins.

Robert Crossley, in his 2011 non-fiction book Imagining Mars: A Literary History on the history of Mars in fiction, commented on Edison's Conquest of Mars that "As fiction it is hackwork; as a commentary on The War of the Worlds it is astonishingly impervious to Wells's anti-imperialist motive; but as an example of how cultural and national values get drawn into the Martian myth it is both instructive and appalling."

== See also ==
- Thomas Edison in popular culture
- The War of the Worlds
- Fighters from Mars
- The Germ Growers - Which actually featured alien abductions before this novel
- Alien Invasion

== Sources ==
- Chalker, Jack L.; Mark Owings (1998). The Science-Fantasy Publishers: A Bibliographic History, 1923-1998. Westminster, MD and Baltimore: Mirage Press, Ltd. p. 138.
- Tuck, Donald H. (1978). The Encyclopedia of Science Fiction and Fantasy. Chicago: Advent. p. 384. ISBN 0-911682-22-8.
