= Fighters from Mars =

1897–1898 serial novel

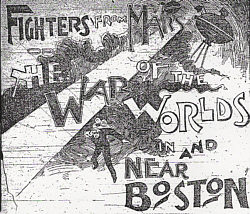
- Author: Original H. G. Wells, edited versions unknown
- Language: English
- Genre: Science fiction
- Publication date: 1897–1898
- Publication place: United States
- Preceded by: The War of the Worlds
- Followed by: Edison's Conquest of Mars

Fighters from Mars is the name of two unauthorized, edited versions of H. G. Wells' original The War of the Worlds serial.

The first version appeared in the New York Evening Journal between December 5, 1897, and January 11, 1898, and was entitled Fighters from Mars, or The War of the Worlds. The second version appeared in The Boston Post between January 8, 1898, and February 1898, and was entitled Fighters from Mars, or The War of the Worlds in and near Boston.

The editor(s) of these versions changed the setting to the local area where the newspapers were on sale; they also edited out most of the passages containing science, science details pertaining to ordinary people, and problematic actions by the narrator. Even though they are considered unauthorized, it does seem that Wells may have inadvertently given the go ahead to the versions. This may be seen from a letter that was published in the magazine The Critic in March 1898, where Wells states: "Yet it is possible that this affair is not so much downright wickedness as a terrible mistake."

In each paper, Garrett P. Serviss' sequel, Edison's Conquest of Mars, was published after Fighters from Mars had finished.

== Legacy ==
Rocket scientist Robert H. Goddard read both Fighters from Mars and Edison's Conquest of Mars and credited them with helping form his early interest in developing rockets for interplanetary exploration.

== See also ==
- Alien invasion
- The War of the Worlds
- Edison’s Conquest of Mars

== Sources ==
- Fighters From Mars, or The War of the Worlds (1897-1898). New York: New York Evening Journal. 1897.
- Fighters From Mars, or The War of the Worlds in and near Boston (1898). Boston: The Boston Evening Post newspaper. 1898.
- The Critic, March 1898, Vol. 29, page 184.
- Fighters From Mars. Steven Mollmann, blog entry April 21, 2009.
- H.G. Wells' Fighters from Mars? LOC blog entry 8 December 2022
- Review of sequel (with reference to Fighters From Mars)
