= Moon Maid (disambiguation) =

The Moon Maid is a novel by Edgar Rice Burroughs.

Moon Maid or Moonmaids may also refer to:

- Moon Maid (comics), character in Dick Tracy comics
- Moonmaids (vocal group), American vocal group

== See also ==
- Moon Maiden (disambiguation)
