= The Sky Pirate (novel) =

1909 novel by Garrett P. Serviss

The Sky Pirate is a science fiction novel by writer Garrett P. Serviss. It was serialized in 1909 in the periodical The Scrap Book. Owned by Frank Munsey, it was given further periodical publication by being syndicated out to newspapers around America, which in those days included short stories and serialized fiction. However, it has never been published in book form until Pulpville Press published it in 2018.

== Synopsis ==
The synopsis is one that accompanied the story in the El Paso Herald in 1911.

Capt. Alfonso Payton, the Sky Pirate, kidnaps Helen Grayman, New York's richest girl, and carries her away in his airship, the Chameleon. He poses as Commodore Brown.

She thinks her abduction is a practical joke. Payton takes her to his lodge in a Labrador wilderness. William Grayman, her father, secretly summons the police.

By wireless telephone Payton demands $10,000,000 ransom from Grayman, who agrees to meet him at Tribes Hill with the money. Grayman plans to trap the pirate.

Helen and her maid are well cared for by Payton, but are closely guarded by Indian John. Helen suspects that they are prisoners.

One after another Payton captures four police aeroplanes sent to trap him and kills several policemen before Grayman reaches the scene.

Grayman and police commissioner Braman reach Tribes Hill. Payton kidnaps Grayman, who again promises to pay the ransom.

Payton takes Grayman home. Helen receives a forged letter from her father, which reassures her. She replies to her father's letter.

Grayman fears Helen will fall in love with Payton. Secretary Grantham offers government aid and assigns Lieut. Allan the task of locating Payton's lodge.

This Allan does by receiving wireless messages from Payton at New York and Buffalo with the aid of geometry and his new invention.

Allan, Grayman and Grantham start for Payton's lodge with five war aeroplanes. Helen, learning that she has been kidnapped, escapes, but is captured.

Allan's war aeroplanes reach Payton's lodge. The Chameleon fires on them, disabling Allan's favorite aeroplane, the Eagle.

Payton escapes with Helen and her maid in the Chameleon, pursued by Allan's Osprey and Skylark. Allan fires at the Chameleon.

Payton cripples the Skylark and dodges from cloud to cloud in desperate efforts to escape from Allan's Osprey.

The Osprey cripples the Chameleon. Payton and Helen drop to the ground in parachutes. Allan goes to Helen's rescue, defending her against Payton's attacks.

In the final chapters, Helen and Allan are taken prisoner. By this time, they have fallen in love. When Payton means to kill Allan as too difficult a captive, Helen avows her love and swears she will make her father pay the ransom if only Payton will spare the Revenue officer. After considering it, and the trustworthiness of Graymans so far, Payton goes to shoot Allan. In the nick of time, the remaining Revenue aero drops in to the rescue. They hunt the wily Payton overland from the sky. When they find him, he stages a fearless last stand. The shot that blows away the rock on which he stood leaves no body. It remains a comforting thought to Mr. and Mrs. Allan that perhaps the Sky Pirate's luck held and he got away retiring thereafter from crime.

== The World of The Sky Pirate ==
It is a postulated 1939. Some years back, France and Great Britain fought each other in a war in which aeros had significant battles. Even when badly damaged, they generally sink slowly through the air rather than crash.

Aeros are semi-rigid dirigibles with pendant ship-like hulls and aeroplanes, fan-like wings, on each side for both maneuvering and some lift. They carry two-person parachutes with small baskets beneath them to escape in emergencies when the aero cannot reach ground. The illustrations by Parker show propellers fore and aft on the boat hull, with rudders at both ends, as well. In the story, top speeds are 140 miles per hour.

Firearms have been replaced by electric guns which propel a shot without much noise and with no interfering smoke. The fighting ships in the story carry two, and the pistols and rifles are electric as well. Aeros may also carry bombs to drop.

Communications for the upper class are by wireless phone, a kind of voice radio. "Directed calls" go from one known station to another, rather like a cell phone call. "Undirected calls" are used for stations in transit, and Payton uses this to communicate with Grayman without giving away his position. While he uses a directed signal, he requires Grayman to send undirected. This is crucial to the plot, for Allen uses a radio direction finder to triangulate on the Sky Pirate when they know him to be at his "home port."

The "revenue service" seems to be a variation on the Revenue Marines, better known to us as the US Coast Guard. It either indicates a change in North American political boundaries or a complete disregard of international borders (perhaps an oversight by Serviss, whose political science is weak in his fiction) that Allan and Grantman do not check with anyone when they hunt down Payton in Labrador, which is part of Canada for us.
