= The Moon Maiden =

1915 novel by Garrett P. Serviss

- Cover of the first book publication
- Author: Garrett P. Serviss
- Language: English
- Genre: Science fiction novel
- Publisher: William L. Crawford without imprint
- Publication date: 1978
- Publication place: United States
- Media type: Print (Paperback)
- Pages: 97 pp

The Moon Maiden is a science fiction novel by Garrett P. Serviss. It was first published in book form in 1978 by William L. Crawford, without imprint, in an edition of 500 copies. The novel originally appeared in the magazine Argosy in 1915.

== Plot introduction ==
The novel concerns a love tale and lunar beings who have been guiding the Earth for millennia.
