= Tales from the Bully Pulpit =

2004 graphic novel by Benito Cereno and Graeme MacDonald

Tales From The Bully Pulpit is an American graphic novel released October 25, 2004. It was written by Benito Cereno, illustrated by Graeme MacDonald, and distributed by Image Comics. The comic stars Theodore Roosevelt, the ghost of Thomas Edison, and a time machine stolen from H. G. Wells, and has cameos from several historical figures.

Tales From the Bully Pulpit traces Roosevelt (or "Teddy") and Edison's adventure through time into the future, where Teddy discovers that a descendant (and look-alike) of Adolf Hitler has survived, and is planning on creating a new war and a new holocaust on Mars, this time pitting the green-skinned Martians against the blue-skinned Martians.

Teddy's characterization in this comic hearkens back to his rough rider days more than his days as the President of the United States—he is portrayed more as an adventurer than as a statesman.

The comic makes many references to other comics and film - including Back to the Future, Bill and Ted's Excellent Adventure, Maus, and Watchmen - and parodies many tropes of science fiction and pulp story-telling.

Tales From the Bully Pulpit, although fast becoming a new cult-favorite, did not have a large initial print run, and has become difficult to find. The cover art, though uncredited, was done by the Eisner Award-nominated Tony Moore.

The sequel Tales From the Bully Pulpit vol 2: Legend of the Black Maria has no confirmed print date, but Benito Cereno has confirmed both its title and eventual existence.

== Critical reaction ==
Publishers Weekly found it entertaining, "exceedingly smart and funny", but criticised the lack of deeper themes that left the comic essentially superficial, Comic Book Resources considered it "delightfully simple in its awesomeness".

== See also ==
- Thomas Edison in popular culture
