= Garrett P. Serviss =

American novelist (1851–1929)

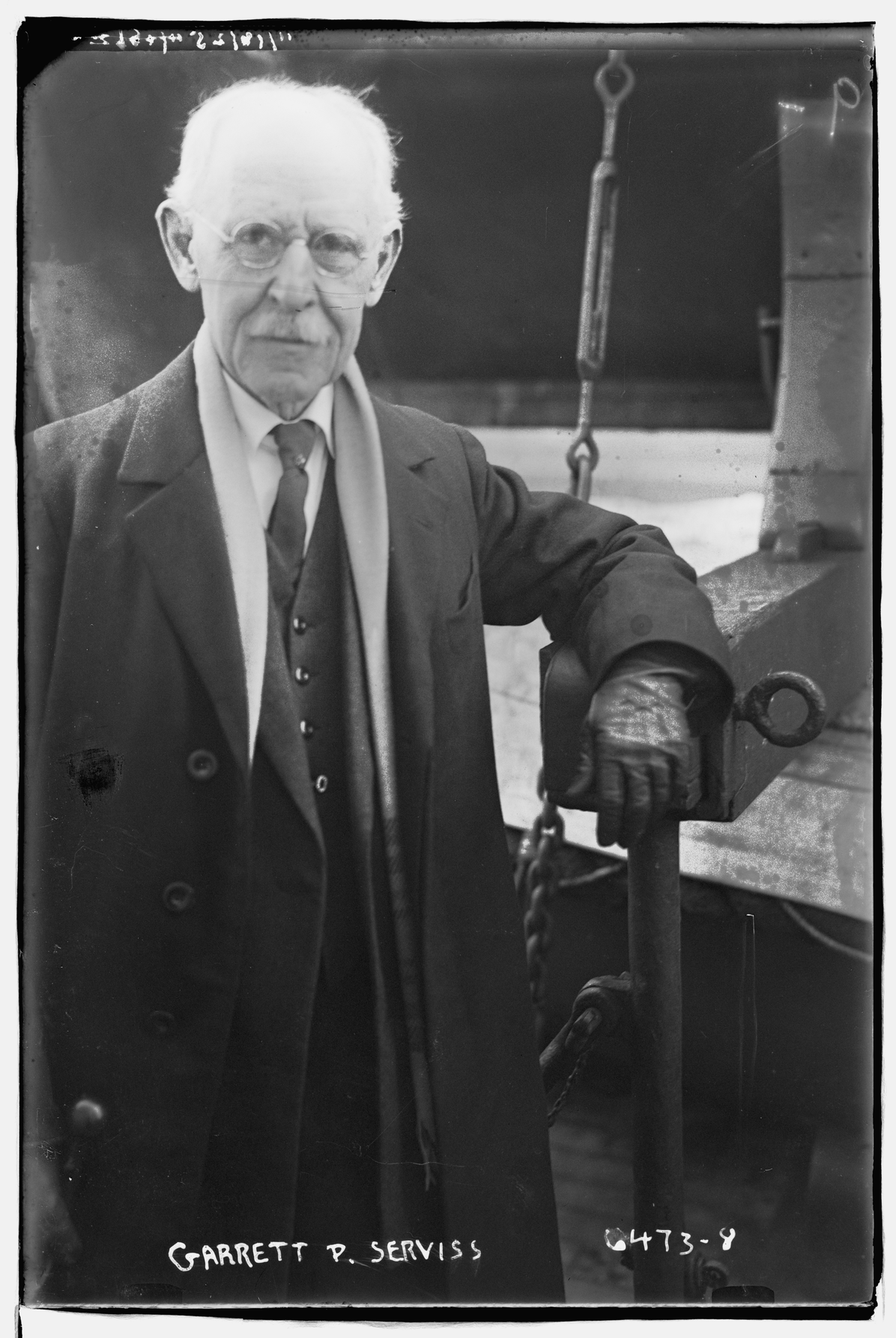
- Garrett Serviss in November 1925
- Born: March 24, 1851; New York State
- Died: May 25, 1929 (aged 78)
- Education: Cornell University; Columbia Law School
- Occupations: Journalist; astronomer; author

Garrett Putnam Serviss (March 24, 1851 – May 25, 1929) was an American astronomer, popularizer of astronomy, and early science fiction writer. Serviss was born in Sharon Springs, New York, and majored in science at Cornell University. He took a law degree at Columbia University but never worked as an attorney. Instead, in 1876 he joined the staff of The New York Sun newspaper, working as a journalist until 1892 under editor Charles Dana.

Serviss showed a talent for explaining scientific details in a way that made them clear to the ordinary reader, leading Andrew Carnegie to invite him to deliver The Urania Lectures in 1894 on astronomy, cosmology, geology, and related matters. With Carnegie's financial backing, these lectures were illustrated with magic lantern slides and other effects to show eclipses, presumed lunar landscapes, and much else. Serviss toured the United States for over two years delivering these lectures, then settled down to become a popular speaker in the New York area. He also wrote a syndicated newspaper column devoted to astronomy and other sciences and wrote frequently for the leading magazines of the day.

Serviss' favorite topic was astronomy, and of the fifteen books he wrote, eight are devoted to it. He unquestionably was more widely read by the public on that topic than anyone prior to his time. He worked with Max and Dave Fleischer on The Einstein Theory of Relativity (1923), a short silent film released in connection with one of Serviss' books. He also wrote six works of fiction in his lifetime, all of which would today be classified as science fiction. Five of these were novels, and one was a short story.

In his private life, Serviss was an enthusiastic mountain climber. He described his reaching the summit of the Matterhorn at the age of 43 as part of an effort "to get as far away from terrestrial gravity as possible." His son was the Olympic high jumper Garrett Serviss.

A quotation from Serviss' Astronomy with the Naked Eye (1908) appears at the end the short story "Beyond the Wall of Sleep" (1919) written by H. P. Lovecraft.

== Bibliography ==
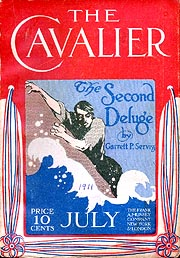

Scientific popularizations

- Astronomy with an Opera Glass, 1888
- Pleasures of the Telescope, 1901
- Other Worlds: Their Nature, Possibilities and Habitability in the Light of the Latest Discoveries, 1901
- The Moon: A Popular Treatise, 1907
- Astronomy with the Naked Eye, 1908
- The End of the World, 1908 (Final essay "Der Weltuntergang" in a German non-fiction anthology titled "Die Welt in hundert Jahren", translation: The World in 100 Years)
- Curiosities of the Sky, 1909
- Round the Year with the Stars, 1910
- Astronomy in a Nutshell, 1912
- The Einstein Theory of Relativity, 1923

Science fiction

- Edison's Conquest of Mars, 1898 novel (written on commission from The Boston Post as a sequel to "Fighters from Mars", an un-authorized and heavily altered version of H. G. Wells' The War of the Worlds)
- "The Moon Metal", 1900 (short story)
- A Columbus of Space, 1909 novel (dedicated to people who read Jules Verne and written in his style; first published in All-Story Weekly magazine in 1909; reprinted in Amazing Stories 1926 and republished by G. W. Dilligham in 1974, by Hyperion Press)
- The Sky Pirate, 1909 novel (published in serialized form; published in book form by Pulpville Press, 2018)
- The Second Deluge, 1911 novel
- The Moon Maiden, 1915 novel
