= Benito Cereno (writer) =

American comic book writer

- Born: Jamie Groover
- Area: Writer
- Notable works: Tales from the Bully Pulpit, Hector Plasm

Jamie Groover is an American comic book writer who uses the pen name Benito Cereno. He is best known as the writer and co-creator of 2004's Tales from the Bully Pulpit and Hector Plasm. His work first appeared as strips in early issues of Robert Kirkman's comic book Invincible. These backups were illustrated by Nate Bellegarde, and included such characters as the Deep-Fried Monkey, Deep-Fried Pirate, and pseudo-autobiographical versions of the duo themselves.

Along with Bellegarde, Cereno created the supernatural investigator Hector Plasm. A compilation of short stories from both Western Tales of Terror and Invincible were re-printed in 2006 as Hector Plasm: De Mortuis. A follow-up book, Hector Plasm: Totentanz, was published in 2009 and has the theme of Halloween celebrations around the world.

He is the current writer of the New England Comics Press ongoing bi-monthly The Tick New Series with artist Les McClaine. This is the first ongoing series featuring The Tick since Ben Edlund's departure from his creation.

== Bibliography ==
(2025) - Blood & Thunder
(2009) - The Tick New Series
(2009) - Hector Plasm: Totentanz
(2009) - Invincible Presents: Atom Eve and Rex Splode
(2009) - The Adventures of Dr. McNinja Volume 3: Operation Dracula! From Outer Space ("Beeman in: 'A Death in the Family'")
(2008) - The Adventures of Dr. McNinja Volume 2: Surgical Strike ("Black Ninja White Ninja")
(2007) - The Tick's 20th Anniversary Special Edition ("King Arthur of Mars")
(2007) - Invincible Presents: Atom Eve
(2007) - Popgun vol 1 ("Hector Plasm in: Palamon's Conundrum")
(2006) - 24Seven ("None of Them Knew They Were Robots")
(2006) - Hector Plasm: De Mortuis
(2006) - Battle Pope (color) TPB vol 1 (introduction)
(2006) - SuperPatriot: War on Terror #3 (script assist)
(2005) - Image Comics Holiday Special 2005 ("Opening Presents with Benito and Nate!")
(2005) - Western Tales of Terror #2 ("Hector Plasm in: Skull Creek Reservation")
(2004) - Western Tales of Terror #1 ("Hector Plasm in: Ghost Town")
(2004) - Tales from the Bully Pulpit
(2003) - Invincible backups (#s 3, 5-20)
