= Bernadette Pajer =

Author

Bernadette Pajer is an author known for her works, particularly the Professor Bradshaw Mystery series, whodunnits set in her home of Washington State circa 1900, about a professor who applies his knowledge of the new science of electrical engineering to solve murders. She has contributed to the mystery genre with her novels, gaining recognition for her storytelling and character development.

== Biography ==
Pajer is a resident of the Pacific Northwest. Richard Bach, author of Jonathan Livingston Seagull, inspired Bernadette to pursue her passion of writing.

She earned a creative writing certificate from the University of Washington. In 2001 she decided to complete her pre-engineering bachelor's degree that she had started earlier but instead focused on culture, literature, and the arts.

Pajer is a member of Mystery Writers of America, Sisters in Crime, Northwest Science Writers, and the Seattle7Writers.org. She lives in the Seattle area with her husband and son.

== Anti-vaccination lobbying ==
Pajer is a board member of Informed Choice Washington, an organization that opposes vaccination requirements in schools and daycare centers. Pajer lobbied against Washington State HB1638, a bill that banned personal exemptions to the MMR vaccine in the state.

== Professor Bradshaw & Company ==
Pajer's Professor Bradshaw Mysteries explore the changing world of Seattle circa 1900. The series introduces various electrical inventions, such as the Tesla Coil, through the protagonist, Benjamin Bradshaw, a professor of electrical engineering at the University of Washington.

== Publications ==
- A Spark of Death (July 2011)
- Fatal Induction (May 2012)
- Capacity for Murder (June 2013)
- The Edison Effect (September 2014)
