= Costermonger =

Street seller of fruit and vegetables in British towns

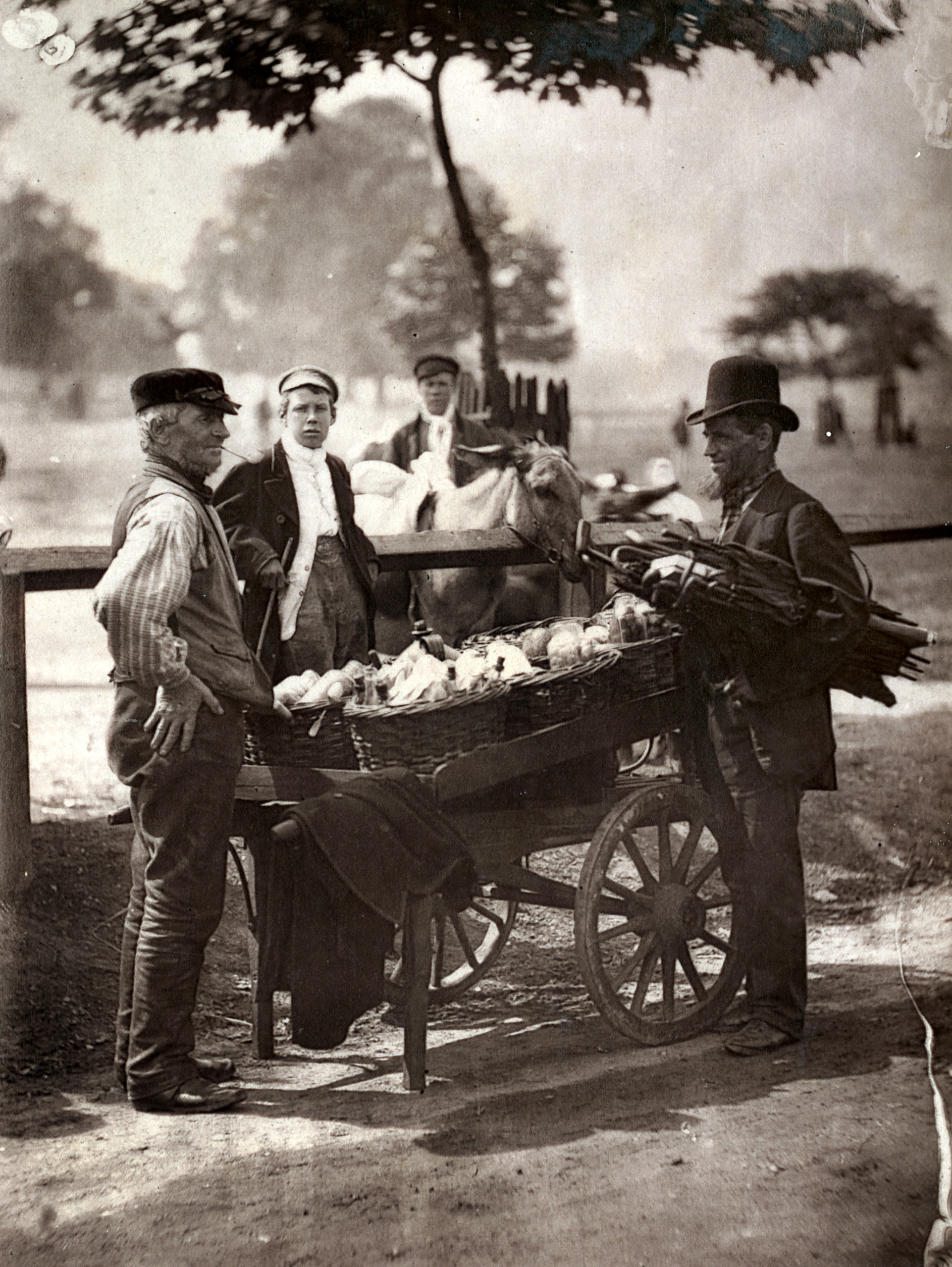
"Mush-fakers" and ginger-beer makers at Clapham Common, 1877 by John Thomson

A costermonger, coster, or costard is a street seller of fruit and vegetables in British towns. The term is derived from the words costard (a medieval variety of apple) and monger (seller), and later came to be used to describe hawkers in general. Some historians have noted a class hierarchy in which the costermonger sold from a handcart or animal-drawn cart, while the lower-level hawker carried wares in a basket.

Costermongers distributed food rapidly from wholesale markets (in London: Smithfield for meat, Spitalfields for fruit and vegetables, Billingsgate for fish) to convenient locations for the labouring classes. Costermongers used a variety of devices to transport and display produce: a cart stood stationary at a market stall; a horse-drawn or wheelbarrow cart made the rounds; or a hand-held basket carried around light-weight goods such as herbs and flowers.

Costermongers survived numerous attempts to eliminate their class from the streets. Programmes to curtail them occurred during the reigns of Elizabeth I and Charles I. Victorian times saw a peak in both their numbers and attempts to suppress them. However, solidarity among costers along with public support enabled their commercial survival until the second half of the 20th century, when they began to take up pitches in the regulated markets.

They became known for their melodic sales patter, poems, and chants, which they used to attract attention. Both the sound and appearance of costermongers contributed to a distinctive street life that characterised London, Paris, and other large European cities, especially in the 18th and 19th centuries. Their loud sing-song cries became part of the fabric of street life in large cities in Britain and Europe. Costermongers exhibited their membership in the coster community through dress, especially the large neckerchief, known as a kingsman. Their hostility to police was legendary. Their distinctive culture and appearance led to considerable appeal as subject-matter for artists, dramatists, comedians, writers and musicians. The cheeky costermonger was a stock character in Victorian music hall shows.

== Etymology ==
The term costermonger first appeared in written English in the early 16th century. The term coster is a corruption of costard, a kind of apple; and the word monger means a trader or broker. The first known use of the term costermonger occurs in the writings of Alexander Barclay, poet and clergyman, in the Fyfte Eglog of Alexandre Barclay of the cytezene and vplandyshman published around 1518. "I was acquaynted with many a hucster [=huckster], with a costardemonger and an hostler." The derivation of the term "costermonger" appears in Samuel Johnson's Dictionary of the English language, published in 1759. Charles Knight's London, published in 1851, also notes that a costermonger was originally an apple-seller. Although the original costermongers worked as itinerant apple-sellers, the word gradually came to refer to anyone who sold fresh fruit or vegetables from a basket, hand cart or temporary stall. The term can be used to describe anyone who sells goods outdoors or in the streets and has come to be a synonym for street vendor.

== Definition and description ==
Most contemporary dictionary definitions of costermonger refer to them as retail sellers or street vendors of fresh produce, operating from temporary stalls or baskets or barrows which are either taken on regular routes for door-to-door selling or which are set up in high traffic areas such as informal markets or lining the streets of busy thoroughfares. The Merriam-Webster Dictionary defines a costermonger as "a person who sells fruit and vegetables outside rather than in a store" while the Collins Dictionary defines a costermonger as "a person who sells fruit or vegetables from a cart or street stand.

Henry Mayhew, a Victorian social commentator, distinguished between itinerant and stationary costermongers in the following terms:

Under the term "costermonger" is here included only such "street-sellers" as deal in fish, fruit, and vegetables, purchasing their goods at the wholesale "green" and fish markets. Of these some carry on their business at the same stationary stall or "standing" in the street, while others go on "rounds." The itinerant costermongers, as contradistinguished from the stationary street-fishmongers and greengrocers, have in many instances regular rounds, which they go daily, and which extend from two to ten miles. The longest are those which embrace a suburban part; the shortest are through streets thickly peopled by the poor, where duly to "work" a single street consumes, in some instances, an hour. There are also "chance" rounds. Men "working" these carry their wares to any part in which they hope to find customers. The costermongers, moreover, diversify their labours by occasionally going on a country round, travelling on these excursions, in all directions, from thirty to ninety and even a hundred miles from the metropolis. Some, again, confine their callings chiefly to the neighbouring races and fairs.

Technically, costermongers were hawkers since they rarely traded from fixed stalls. They filled a gap in the food distribution system by purchasing produce from the wholesale markets, breaking it down into smaller lots and offering it for retail sale. Their fruit and vegetables were placed in baskets, barrows, carts or on temporary stalls. From an economic viewpoint, they provided form utility (breaking down wholesale lots into smaller retail sizes); place utility (making produce available close to shoppers' place of work or residence) and time utility (making goods available at times that are convenient to shoppers such as when they are on their way to work). Some costermongers walked the streets crying out to sell their produce, while others operated out of unauthorised, but highly organised informal markets, thereby contributing to an informal system of food distribution which was highly valued by the working classes and poorer customers.

While the term costermonger is typically used to describe sellers of fresh produce, primarily fruit, vegetables, fish, and meat, both Victorian commentators and historians point out that costers sold an "astonishly large amount of raw and prepared food." In their photographic essay, Street Life in London, published in 1877, John Thomson and Adolphe Smith depict costermongers selling a variety of fresh and prepared foods as well as beverages—from ginger beer through to iced confections. Mayhew provided extensive descriptions of costers selling potted plants and cut flowers:

The coster ordinarily confines himself to the cheaper sorts of plants, and rarely meddles with such things as acacias, mezereons, savines, syringas, lilacs, or even myrtles, and with none of these things unless cheap. [. . .] A poor costermonger will on a fine summer's day send out his children to sell flowers, while on other days they may be selling watercresses or, perhaps, onions."

Mayhew also pointed out that young coster girls often started out by selling cut flowers and small bunches of herbs:

At about seven years of age the girls first go into the streets to sell. A shallow-basket is given to them, with about two shillings for stock-money, and they hawk, according to the time of year, either oranges, apples, or violets; some begin their street education with the sale of water- cresses.

Images from Street Life in London, by John Thomson and Adolphe Smith, 1877

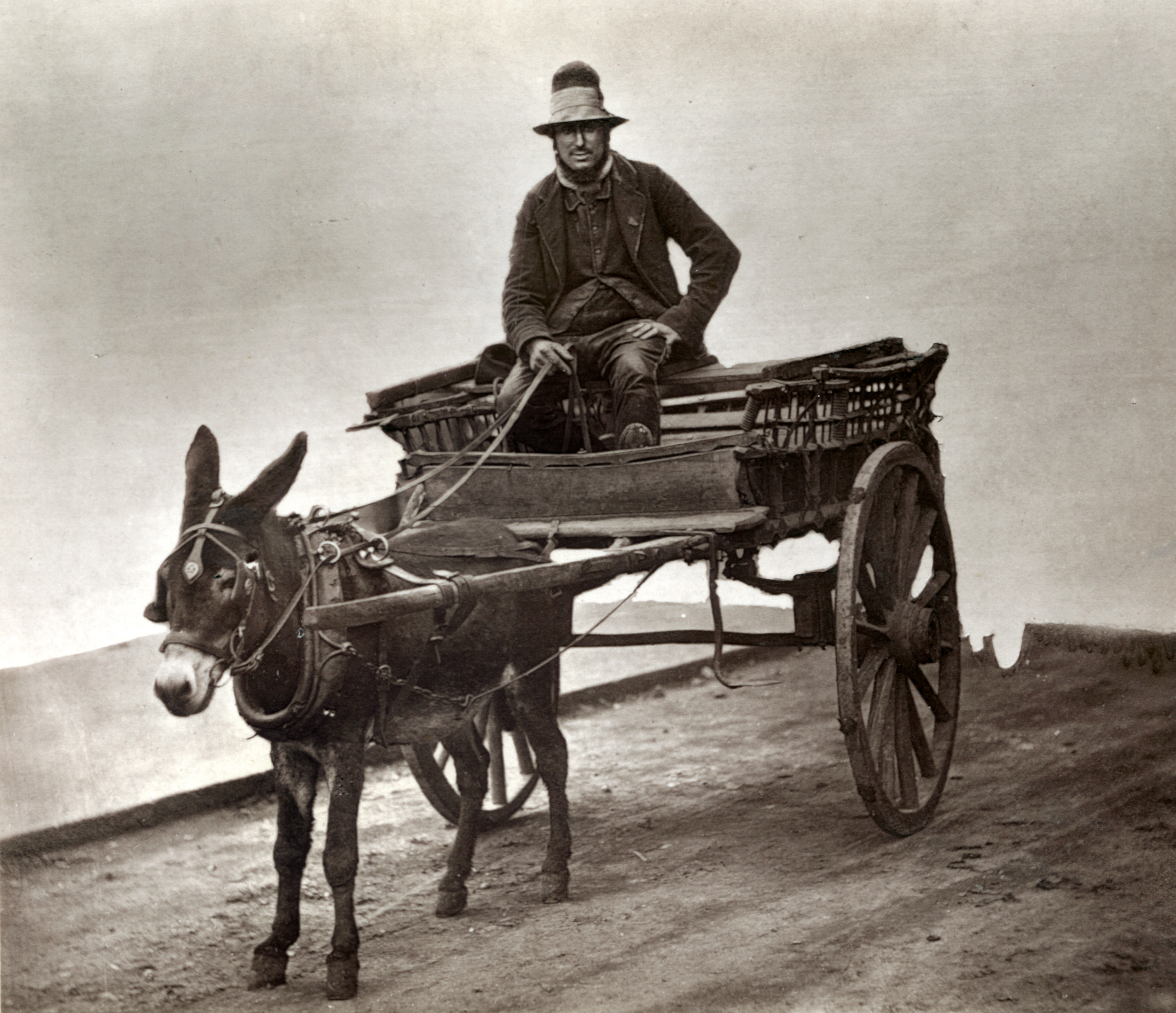
'Black Jack', a London costermonger

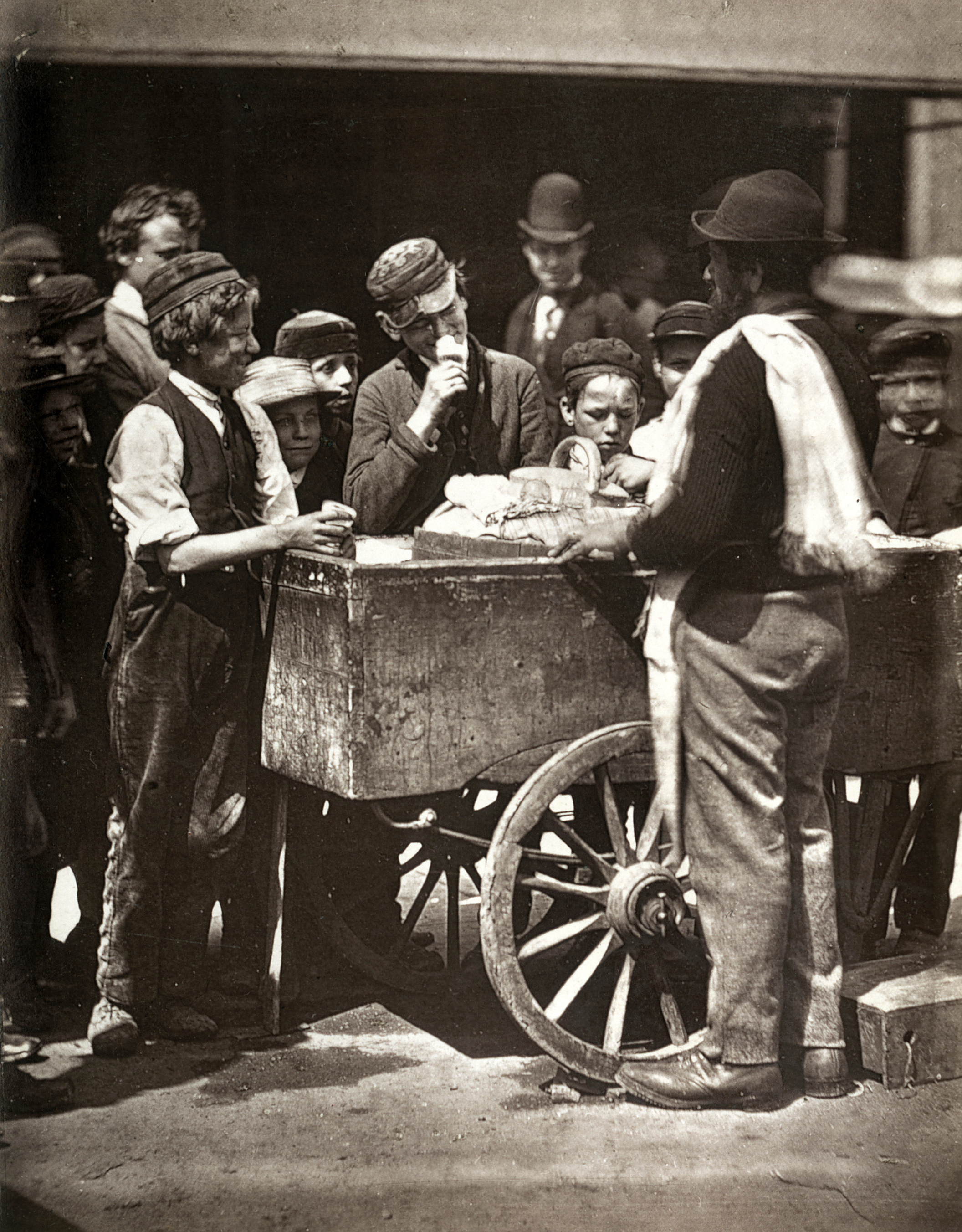
Halfpenny ices

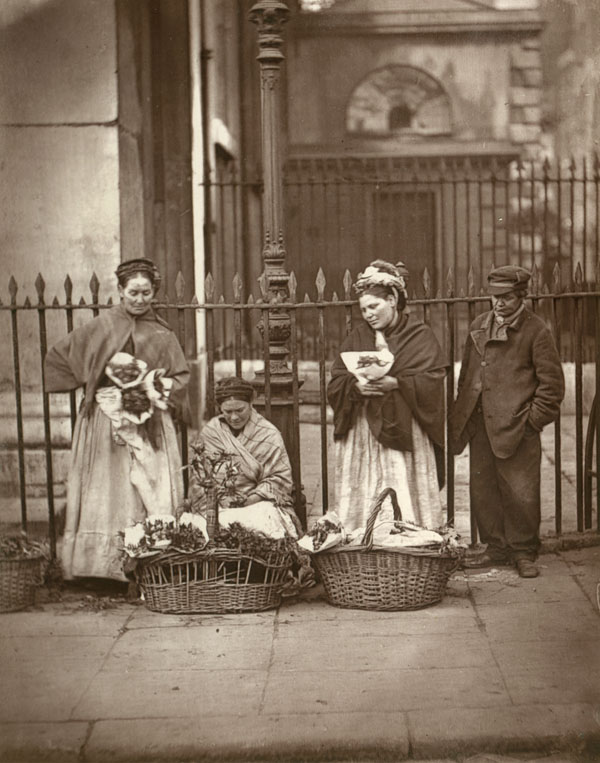
Covent Garden Flower Women

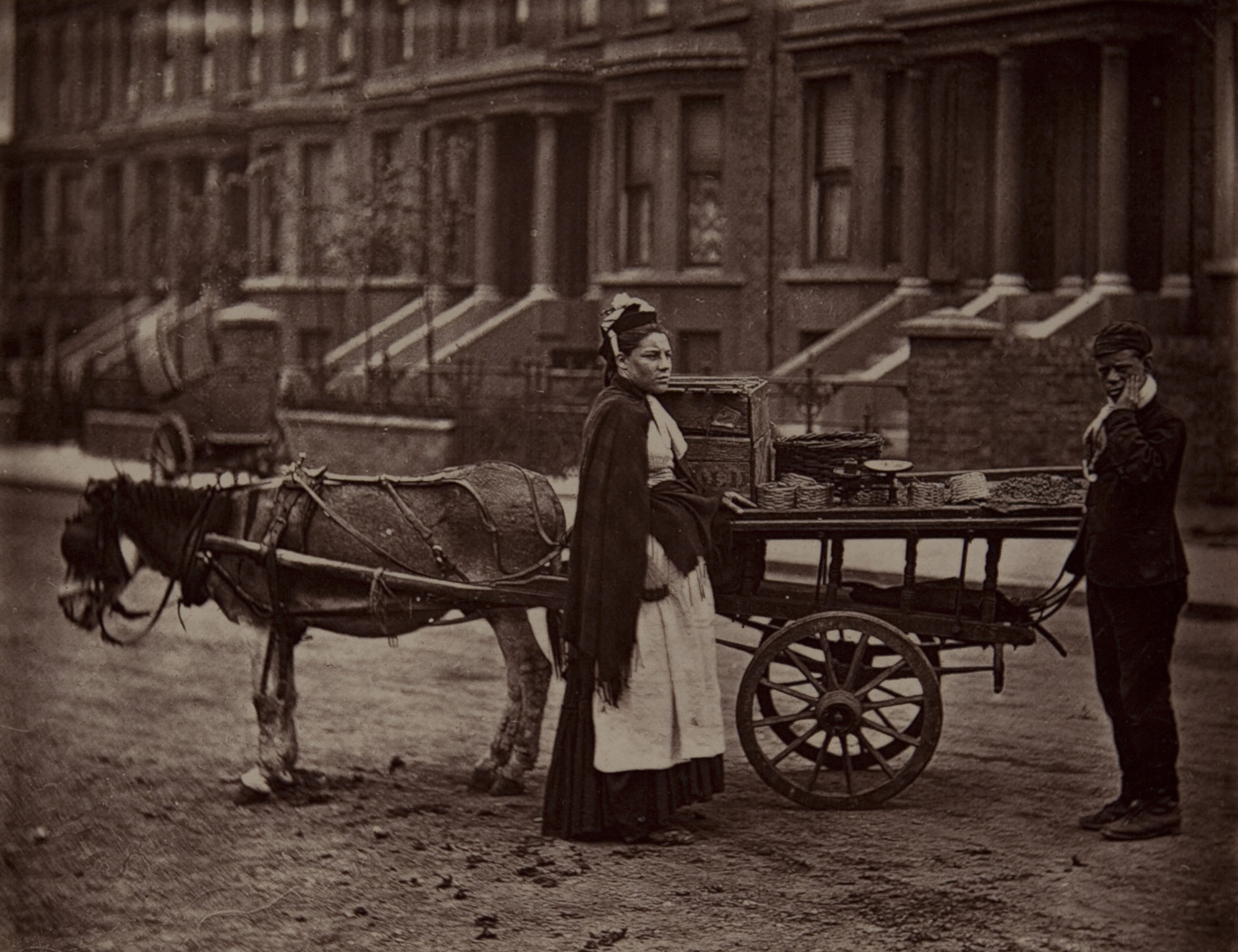
Strawberry seller. Strawberries, All Ripe!, All Ripe!

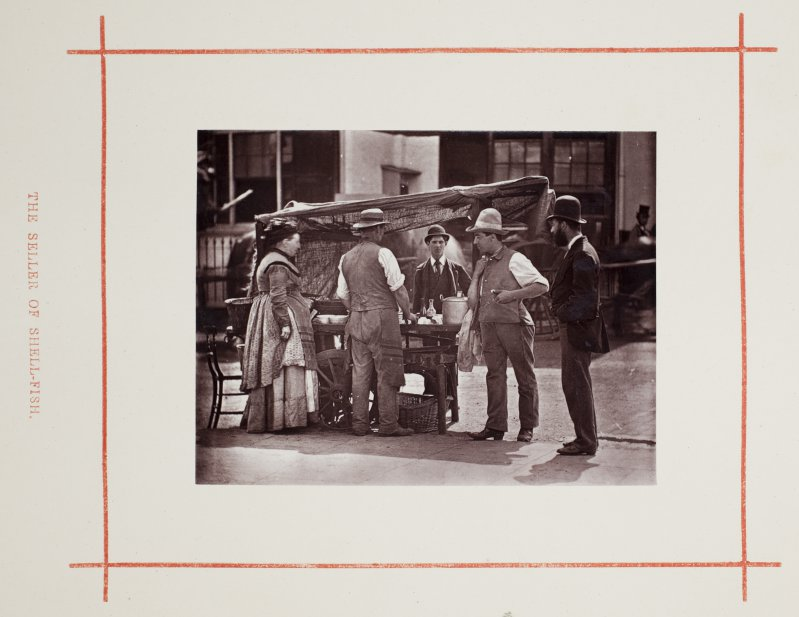
The Seller of Shell-Fish

== History ==
Costermongers were known to have been in London from at least the 15th century, and possibly much earlier. Mayhew, writing in the 1840s, called costermongering an "ancient calling" and attributed the first written descriptions of the street sellers' distinctive cries and sales patter appearing in a ballad, entitled London Lyckpeny by John Lydgate probably written in the late 1300s and first performed around 1409. Shakespeare and Marlowe mention costermongers in their writings.

Although the term 'costermonger' was used to describe any hawker of fresh produce, it became strongly associated with London-based street vendors following a surge in their numbers in the 18th and 19th centuries. They were most numerous during the Victorian era, when Mayhew estimated their London numbers at between 30,000 and 45,000 in the late 1840s.

In the decades after the Great Fire of London, a major rebuilding programme led to the removal of London's main produce market, Stocks Market, in 1773. The displacement of the open market to a less strategic location led to a period of decline for retail markets. While wholesale markets continued to prosper, retail markets lost their foothold. Costermongers filled the gap by providing inexpensive produce in small quantities to the working classes, who, for their part, worked long hours in arduous occupations leaving them no time to attend markets far from the city centre. With the influx of people in London, in the years after the Industrial Revolution, demand outstripped retail capacity, such that costermongers performed a 'vital role' providing food and service to the labouring classes.

Throughout the 18th century, the streets of London filled with costermongers and competition between them became intense. To stand out amid the crowd, costers began to develop distinctive cries. Mayhew describes a Saturday night in the New Cut, a street in Lambeth, south of the river,

Lit by a host of lights… the Cut was packed from wall to wall…. The hubbub was deafening, the traders all crying their wares with the full force of their lungs against the background din of a horde of street musicians.

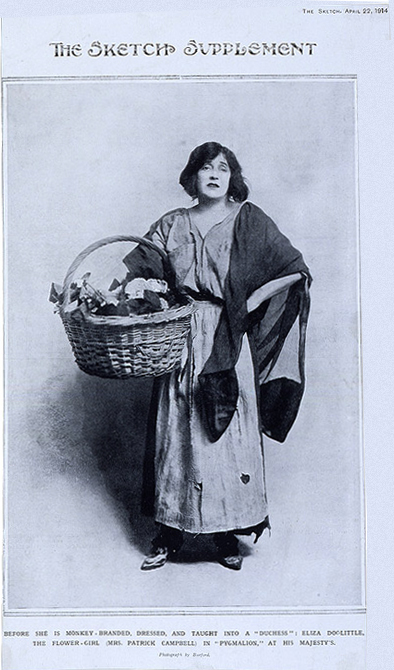
Actress, Mrs Patrick Campbell, dressed in costermonger costume, 1914

During the 19th century, costermongers gained an unsavoury reputation for their "low habits, general improvidence, love of gambling, total want of education, disregard for lawful marriage ceremonies, and their use of a peculiar slang language." Mayhew was aware of this reputation, but exhibited an ambivalent attitude towards them. On the one hand, he described them as usurers and pointed out that cheating was widespread. Weights were flattened to make products look bigger and heavier, and measures were fitted with thick or false bottoms to give false readings. On the other hand, Mayhew also noted that in his own personal experience, "they are far less dishonest than they are usually believed to be. James Greenwood, a Victorian journalist and social commentator, also used derogatory language to describe costermongers and their markets but was aware of the essential service they provided by noting that the poor would be the ultimate "losers" if they were denied access to the costermongering culture which supported them. The Methodist writer, Godfrey Holden Pike, argued that the Sabbath market was vulgar, but in later writings, he noted that "influential newspapers have often misrepresented him [the costermonger]."

Historians such as Jones have argued that the promulgation of a stereotypical image of costermongers was part of a broader agenda to clear London's streets of unruly street vendors, who obstructed traffic in a rapidly growing metropolis that was barely coping with an increasing amount of vehicular traffic and street congestion. In addition, a movement to eradicate Sunday trading altogether was gathering momentum and set its sights on the informal, unregulated retail trade. Broadsheets of the day served to perpetuate costermongers' stigmatised status by stories of the moral decay that surrounded places where costers congregated.

Initiatives to rid the city of street traders were by no means new to the 19th century. Charles Knight wrote of various attempts to curtail street-based trading during the reigns of Elizabeth I (1558–1603) and Charles I (1625–1649). However, from the 1840s, the community of costermongers faced increasing opposition from three distinct quarters: the vestry, which viewed street markets as the focus of public disorder; the movement to abolish Sunday trading; and public authorities who were concerned with the rise of unregulated markets and problems associated with street congestion. Throughout the 1860s, the Commissioner of the Police, Richard Mayne, waged war on costermongers and succeeded in closing several markets while authorities and prominent philanthropists began constructing new covered market places designed to replace street selling.

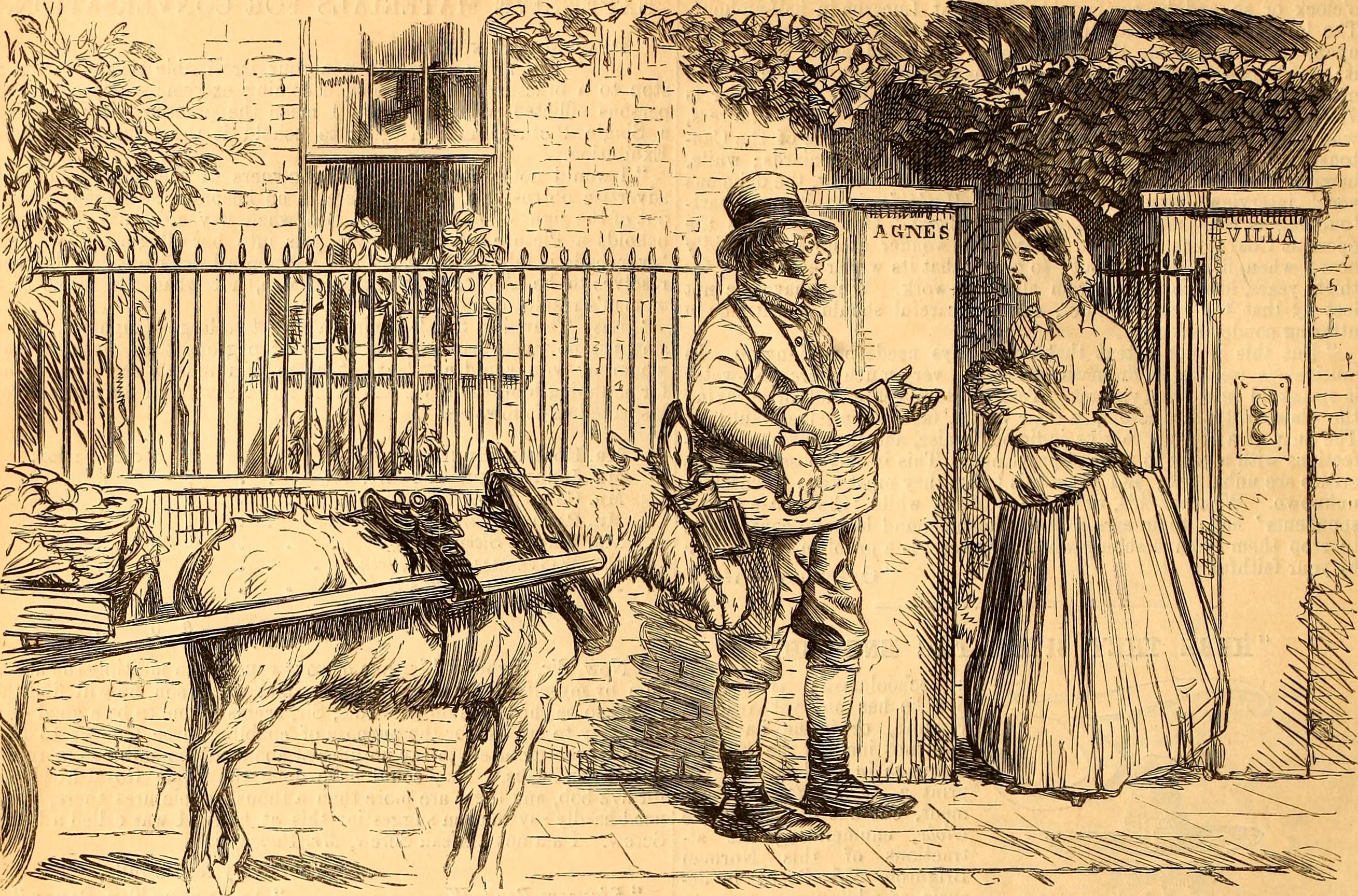
Cartoon featuring a costermonger from Punch, 1841

In London's Bethnal Green, hostilities between authorities and costers reached a peak by the late 1870s. The vestry, claiming that costers were obstructing the streets, contributing to street litter and encouraging gambling and prostitution, resurrected an ancient law to prevent street trading at certain times. They created a Street Regulation Committee and employed a salaried Street Inspector to oversee compliance. They insisted that coffee stalls close by 7.30am daily, precisely when workers, on their way to work, might be in need of a hot drink. Some 700 local residents petitioned against the laws. In spite of the apparent public support, the vestry's persistence resulted in many street vendors being fined. Costermongers in the markets of Club Street and Sclater Street were subject to verbal abuse, had their stalls overturned, their barrows and carts impounded and occasionally their products tipped down a nearby drain.

In February, 1888, the Bethnall Green Costermongers' and Stallkeepers' Society was formed. Its primary aim was to fight prosecutions against costers with the help of a solicitor, who was paid a retainer. When the group learned that similar crackdowns on costers were occurring in St Luke's Parish and St Georges Parish, the group broadened its base, by forming the London United Costermongers' League. Public support was very much on the side of the costermongers. Members of the public were skeptical of the vestry's motivations and believed that shopkeepers were using the issue to eliminate the cheaper produce in order to reduce competitive pressures. Justice of the Peace, Montagu Williams, visited Sclater Street personally and concluded that the vestry had little cause for complaint. From then on, the justices ensured that stall-holders were given minimal fines, taking much of the steam out of the vestry's programme of opposition. The costers also pleaded for assistance from a philanthropist, the Earl of Shaftesbury, who pressed the costers' case with the vestry. Punitive orders were eventually rescinded.

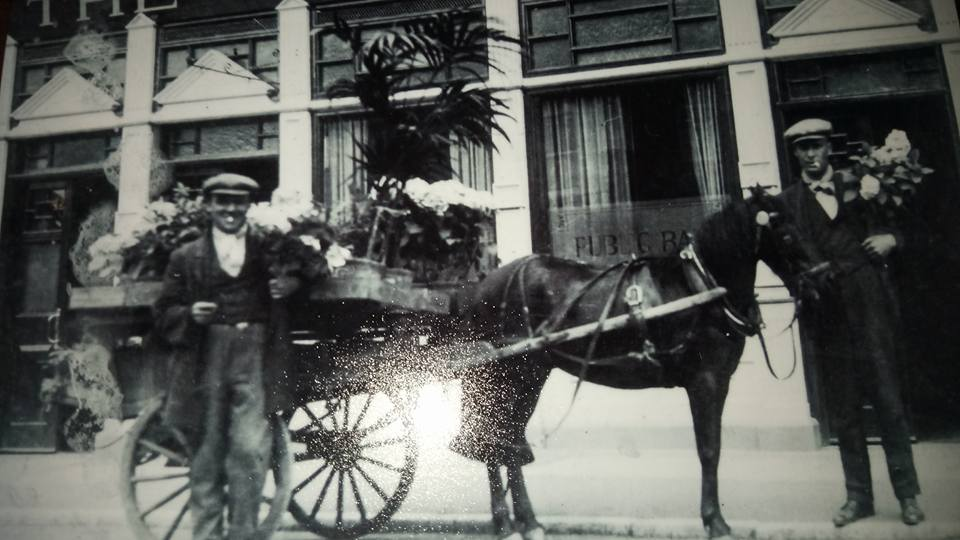
Flower Sellers in Bethnal Green, circa 1930

The events surrounding the costermongers' resistance to various attempts to eradicate them from the streets only heightened their animosity towards the police, which could be extreme. For many members of the working class, the costermongers' highly visible resistance made them heroes. As one historian noted:

With the navvies a state of permanent warfare with civil authority was common, but not inevitable; with the London costermongers it was axiomatic.

By the end of the 19th century, the costermongers were in gradual decline. They did not disappear as mobile street-sellers until the 1960s, when the few that remained took pitches in local markets.

== Irish costermongers ==
Irish immigrants and their descendants made up a considerable number of the trade all across the major cities and towns of Britain, as can be noted from 19th-century commentaries such as Henry Mayhew's London Labour and the London Poor: According to Mayhew,

An Irish costermonger, however, is no novelty in the streets of London. "From the mention of the costardmonger," says Mr. Charles Knight, "in the old dramatists, he appears to have been frequently an Irishman." Of the Irish street-sellers, at present, it is computed that there are, including men, women, and children, upwards of 10,000. Assuming the street-sellers attending the London fish and green markets to be, with their families, 30,000 in number, and 7 in every 20 of these to be Irish, we shall have rather more than the total above given. Of this large body three-fourths sell only fruit, and more especially nuts and oranges; indeed, the orange-season is called the "Irishman's harvest."

== Coster culture and style ==
Costers developed their own culture; notoriously competitive, respected "elder statespeople" in the costermonger community could be elected as pearly kings and queens to keep the peace between rival costermongers. However, crimes such as theft were rare among costermongers, especially in an open market where they tended to look out for one another. Even common thieves preferred to prey on shop owners rather than costers, who were inclined to dispense street justice.

London based costermongers had their own dress code. In the mid-nineteenth century, men wore long waistcoats of sandy coloured corduroy with buttons of brass or shiny mother of pearl. Trousers, also made of corduroy, had the distinctive bell-bottomed leg. Footwear was often decorated with a motif of roses, hearts and thistles. Neckerchiefs—called king's men—were of green silk or red and blue. Covent Garden's flower sellers were immortalised in George Bernard Shaw's Pygmalion.

Henry Mayhew gave a detailed description of the costermonger's attire:

"The costermonger's ordinary costume partakes of the durability of the warehouseman's, with the quaintness of that of the stable-boy. A well-to-do 'coster,' when dressed for the day's work, usually wears a small cloth cap, a little on one side. A close-fitting worsted tie-up skull-cap, is very fashionable, just now, among the class, and ringlets at the temples are looked up to as the height of elegance. Hats they never wear—excepting on Sunday—on account of their baskets being frequently carried on their heads. ... Their waistcoats, which are of a broad-ribbed corduroy, with fustian back and sleeves, being made as long as a groom's, and buttoned up nearly to the throat. If the corduroy be of a light sandy colour, then plain brass, or sporting buttons, with raised fox's or stag's heads upon them—or else black bone- buttons, with a lower-pattern—ornament the front; but if the cord be of a dark rat-skin hue, then mother-of-pearl buttons are preferred. Two large pockets—sometimes four—with huge flaps or lappels, like those in a shooting- coat, are commonly worn. ... The costermonger, however, prides himself most of all upon his neckerchief and boots. Men, women, boys and girls, all have a passion for these articles. ... The costermonger's love of a good strong boot is a singular prejudice that runs throughout the whole class."

Costers were especially fond of mother-of-pearl buttons. Men decorated the legs of their trousers with a line of pearly buttons. By the 19th century, both men and women began adding these pearly buttons to their clothing as James Greenwood describes:

"Any one, however, who knew the significance of; and took into consideration the extraordinary number of mother-o'-pearl buttons that adorned the waistcoat and well-worn fustian jacket of the gentleman in question, would have been at once aware that he was somebody of consequence in costerdom, at all events. ... The pearl button is with him a symbol of position and standing, and by the number of glistening rows that rather for ornament than use, decorate his vestment, his importance amongst his own class may be measured."

In the 1880s, a man by the name of Henry Croft who had long admired the costermonger's way of life as well as their showiness and panache, smothered his worn out suit and accessories with pearly buttons arranged in geometric patterns. Costermongers soon recognised that the public loved these shimmering outfits and began wearing more and more heavily decorated outfits and soon became known as the Pearly Kings and Queens.

Betty May spoke of the "coster" style and atmosphere in London, around 1900, in her autobiography Tiger Woman: My Story:

"I am often caught with a sudden longing regret for the streets of Limehouse as I knew them, for the girls with their gaudy shawls and heads of ostrich feathers, like clouds in a wind, and the men in their caps, silk neckerchiefs and bright yellow pointed boots in which they took such pride. I adored the swagger and the showiness of it all."

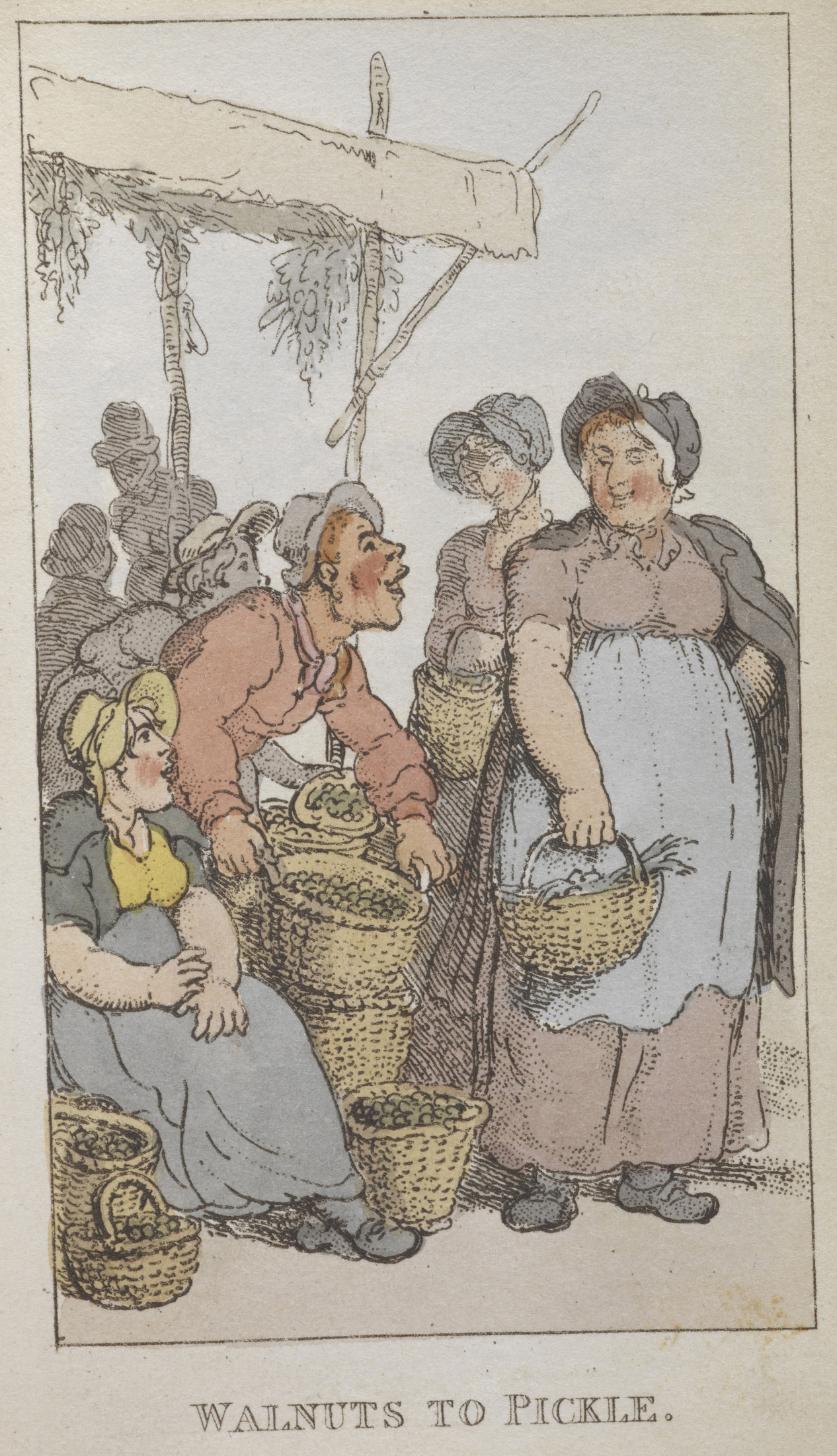
Street traders selling pickled walnuts from Rowlandson's Sketches of the Lower Orders, 1820

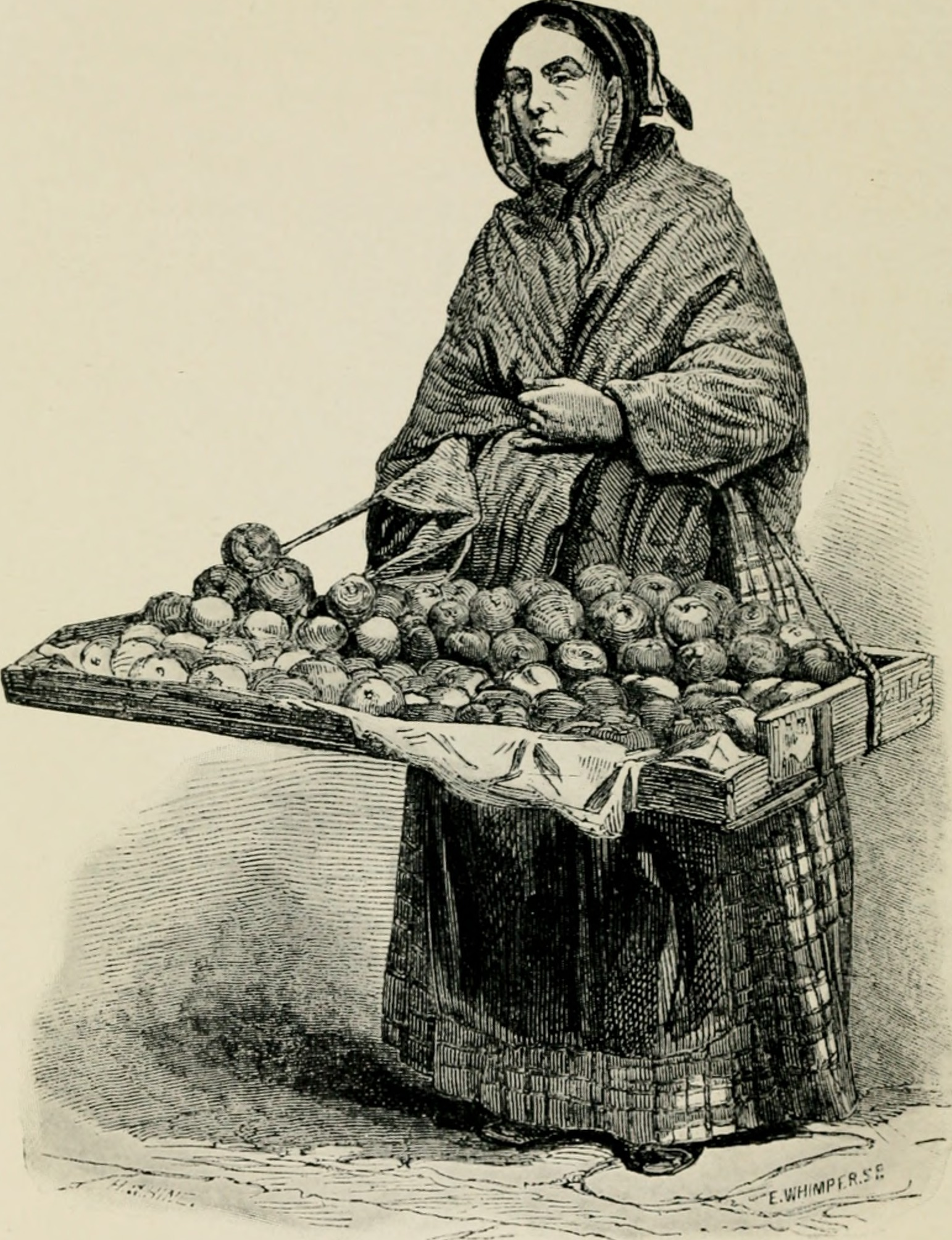
A coster girl, c. 1860

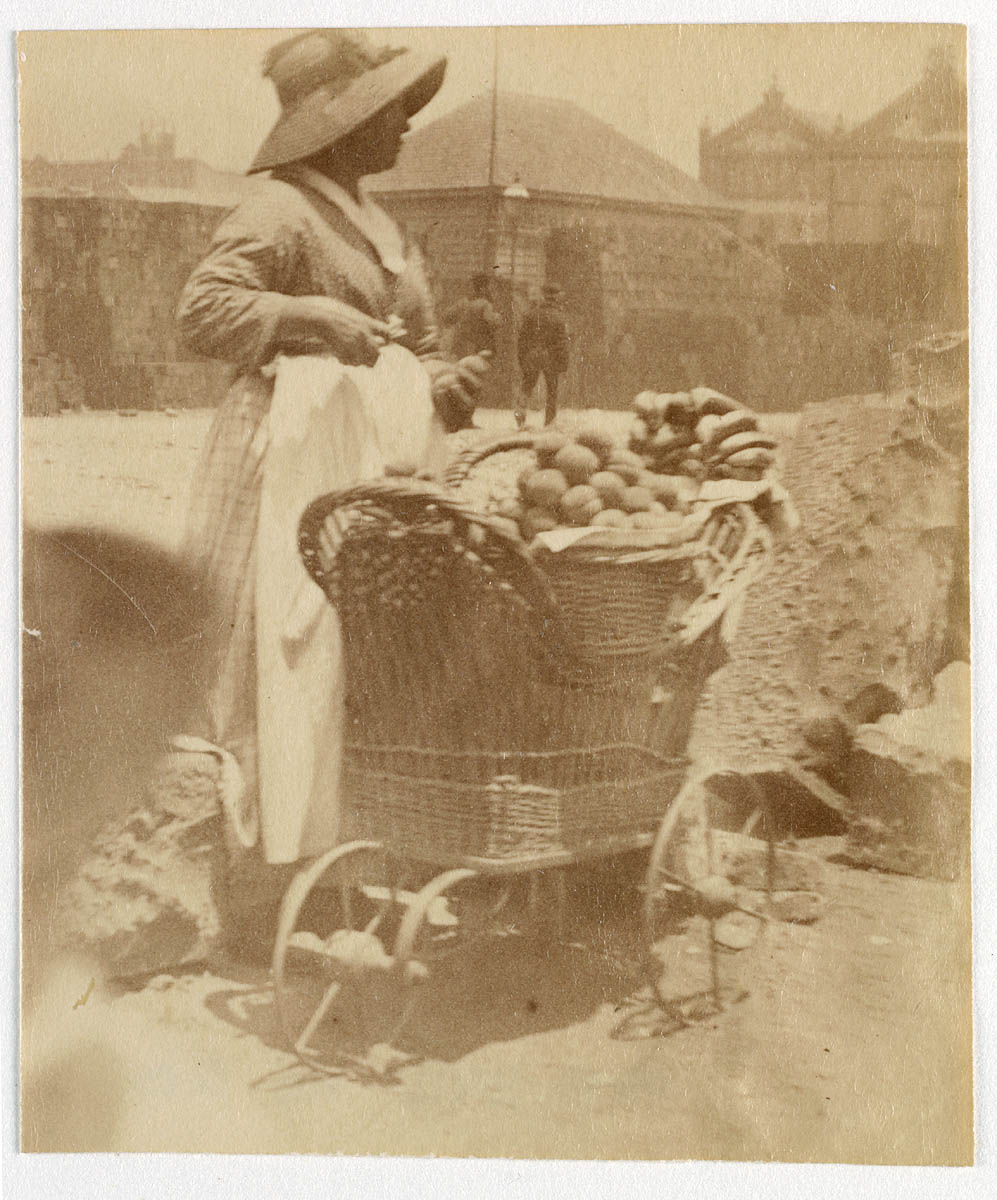
Coster fruit seller with barrow, Sydney, c. 1885 – c. 1890, photographed by Arthur K. Syer

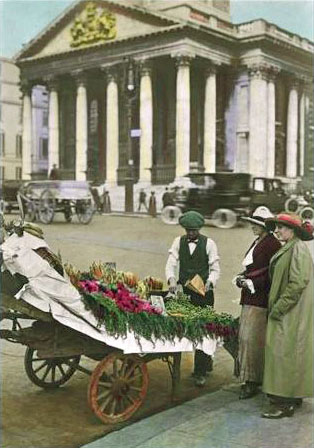
Costermonger in Trafalgar Square, c. 1935

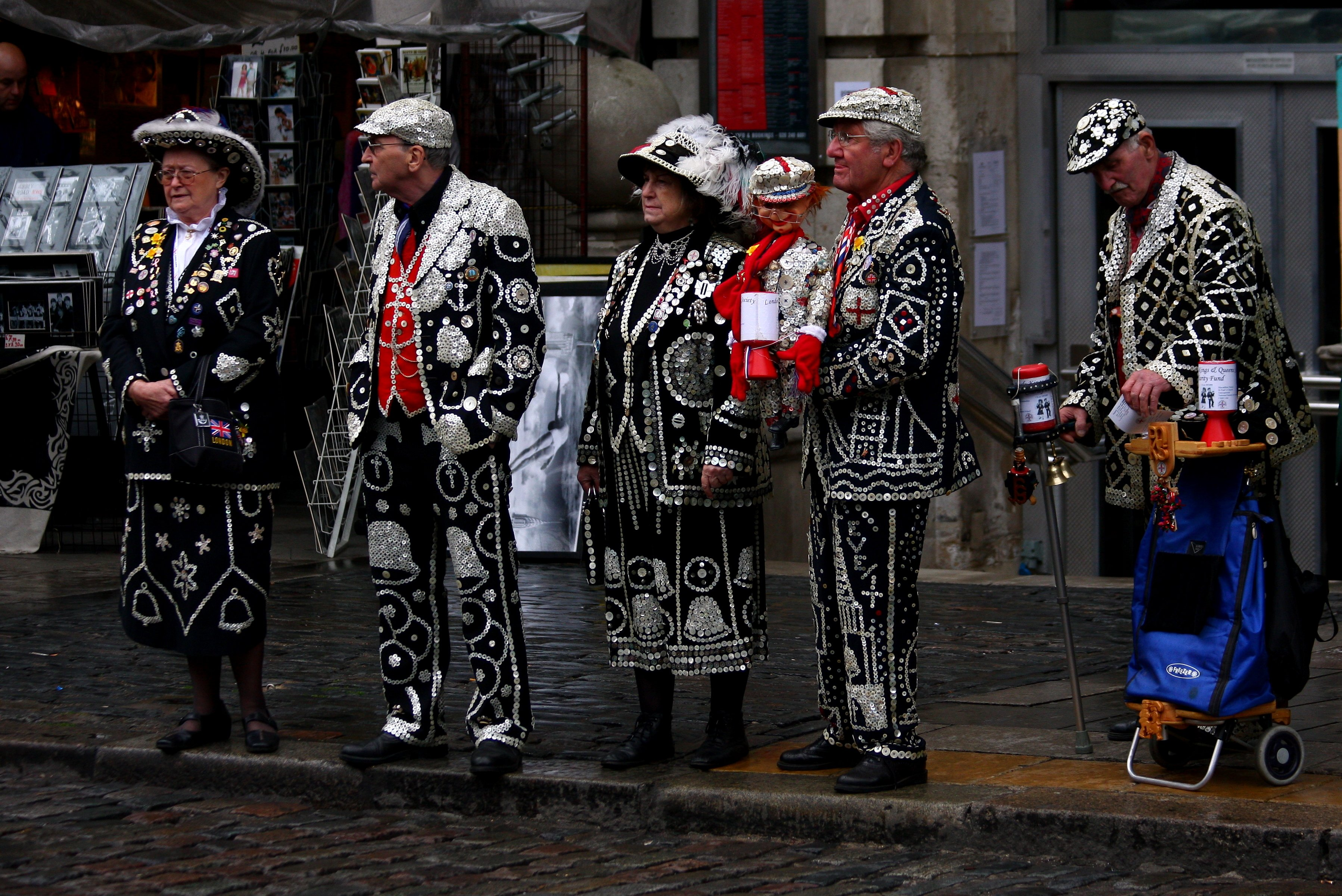
Pearly Kings and Queens

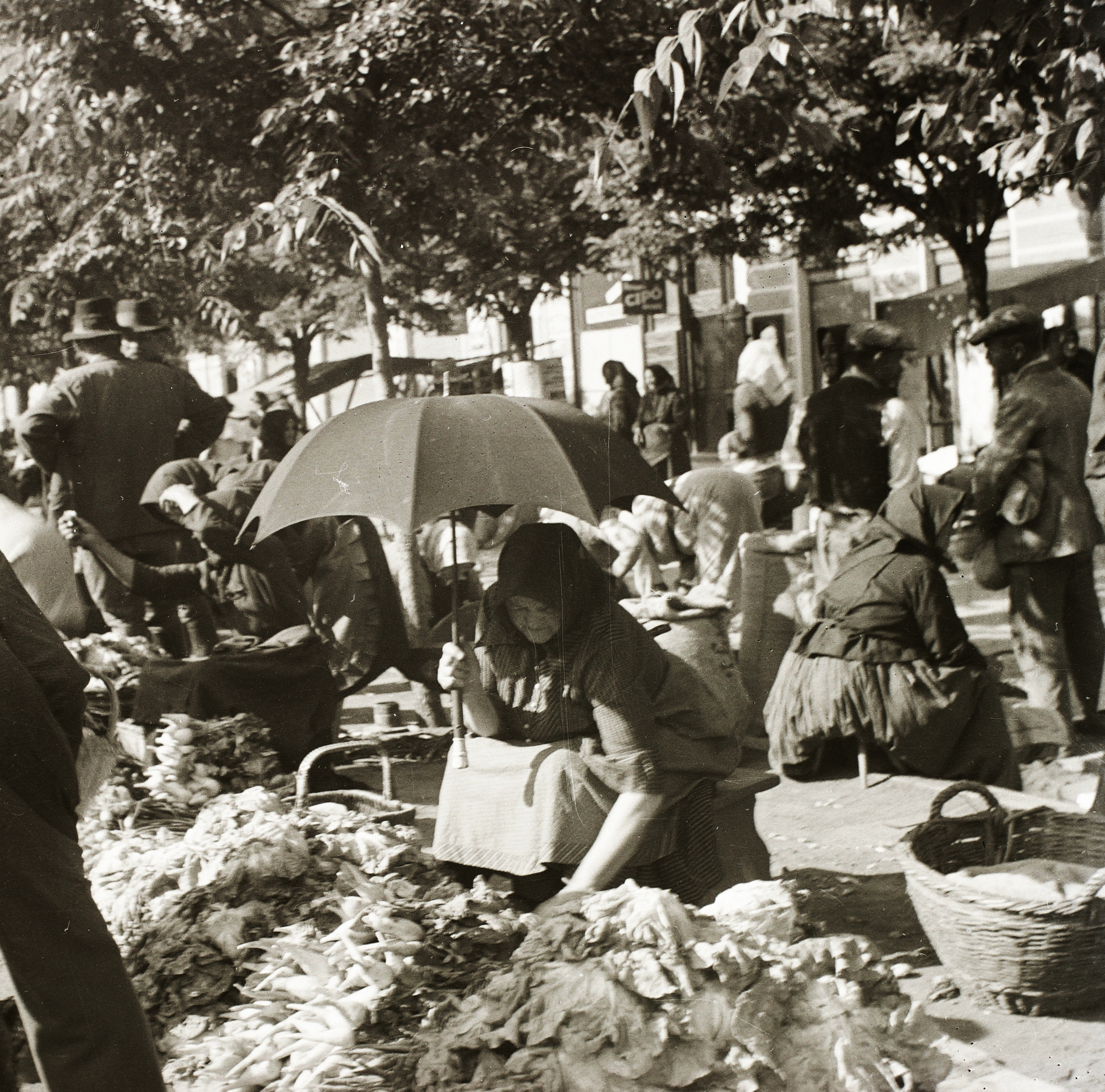
Vegetable costermonger, Hungary, 1935

Costermongers also developed their own linguistic forms. In the 1800s, they spoke back slang; in which ordinary words are said backwards. Examples of back slang include yob for boy; ecslop for police; elbat for table and yennep for penny. Back slang was used as a secret language, a code which only other costermongers understood. In her book, Shadows of the Workhouse, Jennifer Worth observed that "Costers... spoke to each other almost entirely in back slang; incomprensible to an outsider." Many costermongers also used rhyming slang; where any word can be substituted with another word that rhymes with it. Examples of rhyming slang include: tin lids or dustpan lids for kids; jimmy grant for emigrant; apple and pears for stairs; rubbidy dub for pub and trouble and strife for wife. The selection of rhyming words often suggested a symbolic association. For example, a sorrowful tale means three months in jail. Following the second world war, condensed versions of popular terms were more commonly used, such that trouble and strife meaning wife simply became trouble and the phrase down the frog and toad (meaning down the road) would be condensed to down the frog. Historians have advanced various explanations for the rise of a unique coster tongue. One possible explanation is that it protected costers from close surveillance.

Both historians and contemporary commentators have pointed to additional distinctive elements of coster culture. In general, they were a hard-working and hard-drinking lot. They were not party political, showed a "complete disregard for the lawful marriage," were not members of any Church, were intensely loyal to other costermongers, were inclined to lend support to the poor and treated their donkeys very well. They enjoyed relative autonomy in terms of their working hours and appeared to be "under the command of no-one." Their distinctive identity combined with their highly visible position on London streets led to costermongers becoming a symbol of the working class. As Ian Peddie explains:

"Perhaps the most crucial figure in the rearticulation of the working-class image was the costermonger... Costermongers composed their own broadsides wherein they asserted their own political identity in songs."

Mayhew referred to costermongers as a "dangerous class." The coster community was seen as the "vanguard of resistance" in the 19th century. Their open hostilities with police drew widespread public support and costers who were 'sent down' were seen as martyrs and heroes. Historians have pointed to the "subversive potential" of the coster class, because of their ability to make broad social connections that cut across geographic boundaries and "related forms of power and exploitation."

== In literature and the arts ==
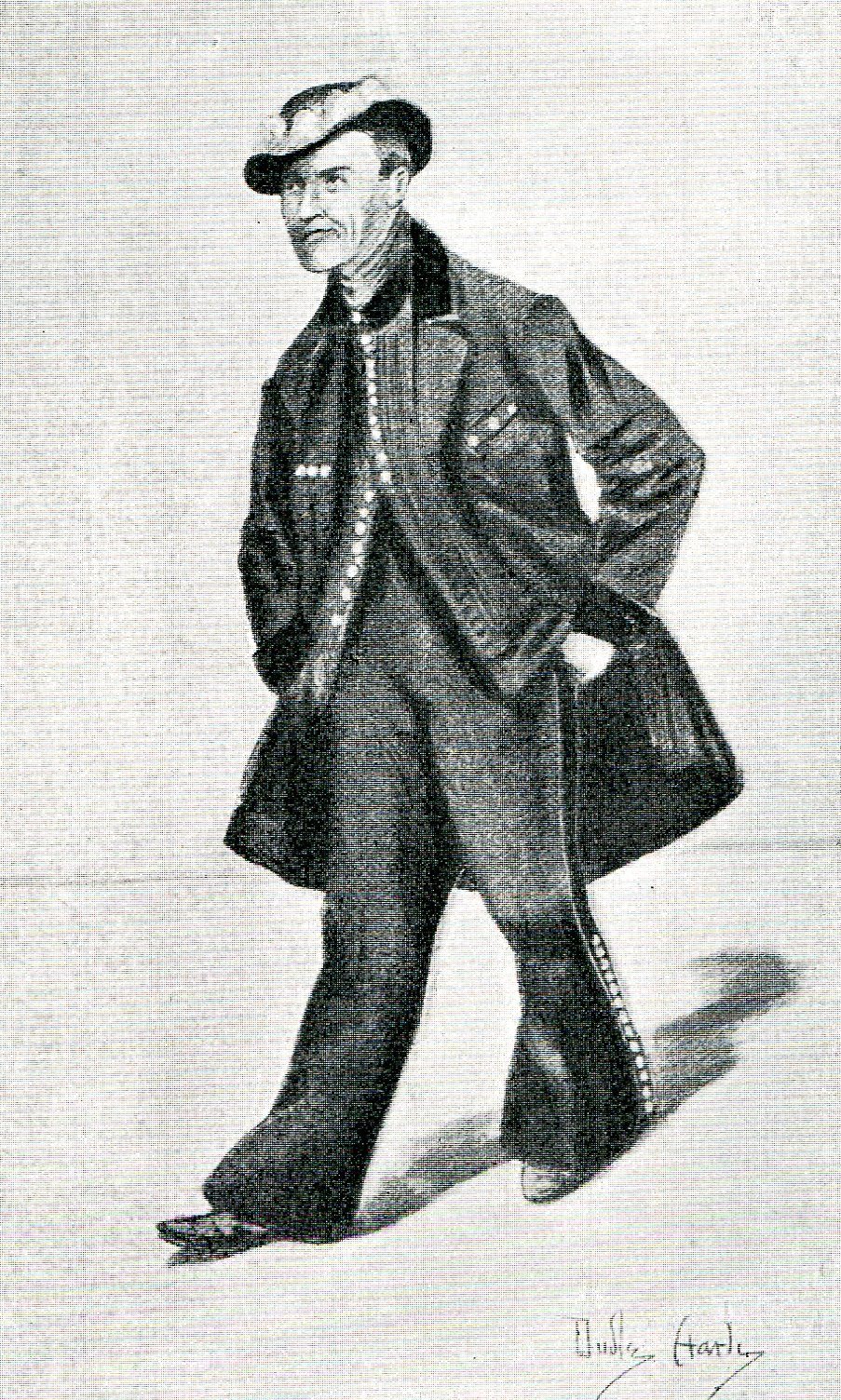
Dudley Hardy's version of Albert Chevalier doing his famous costermonger act c. 1890

Costermongers' distinctive identity meant that they were prime targets for songwriters and musicians. Mayhew pointed out that a ballad, London Lyckpeny written by John Lydgate in about 1409, was a very early example of music inspired by the cries of costermongers as they spruiked cherries and strawberries in the streets. The ballad, is a satire that recounts the tale of a country person visiting London to seek legal remedies after having been defrauded. However, he finds that he cannot afford justice, and is soon relieved of any money he has through his dealings with street sellers, retailers, tavern-keepers and others. A lyckpeny (or lickpenny) is an archaic term for anything that soaks up money. Lydgate's ballad prompted generations of composers to write songs about the distinctive cries of street vendors. By the 18th and 19th centuries, ballads extolling the beauty of the women selling lavender, pretty flowers and water cresses had become a ripe subject for composers of popular songs.

Selected Verse from London Lyckpeny by John Lydgate

Then onto London, I dyde me hie,
Of all the land it beareth the pryse;
"Gode Pescode," owne began to crye,
"Strawpery ripe, and cherrys in the ryse"
Owne bad me draw nere, and by some spyce,
Pepper and saforne, they gan me bede,
And for the lack of mony, I might not spede.

Then I went forth by London Stone,
Throughout Canwyke-streete;
Drapers of cloth offered me anone,
Then comes in one cryed, "hot shepe's feet" -
One cryed "mackerel!" "Peasen green" another gan grete;
And bad me by a hoode, to cover my heade;
But, for want of mony, I might not spede.

Then I hyd me to Estchepe;
One cryes, "Rybbes of beef and many a pye,"
Pewter pottes, they scattered in a hepe,
There was harpe, pype and mynstrelyse,
"Yea by cock!, Nay by cock!," some began to crye
Some songs of Jenken and Julian, for there mede,
But for lack of mony, I might not spede

Selected popular 19th-century tunes with references to costermongers

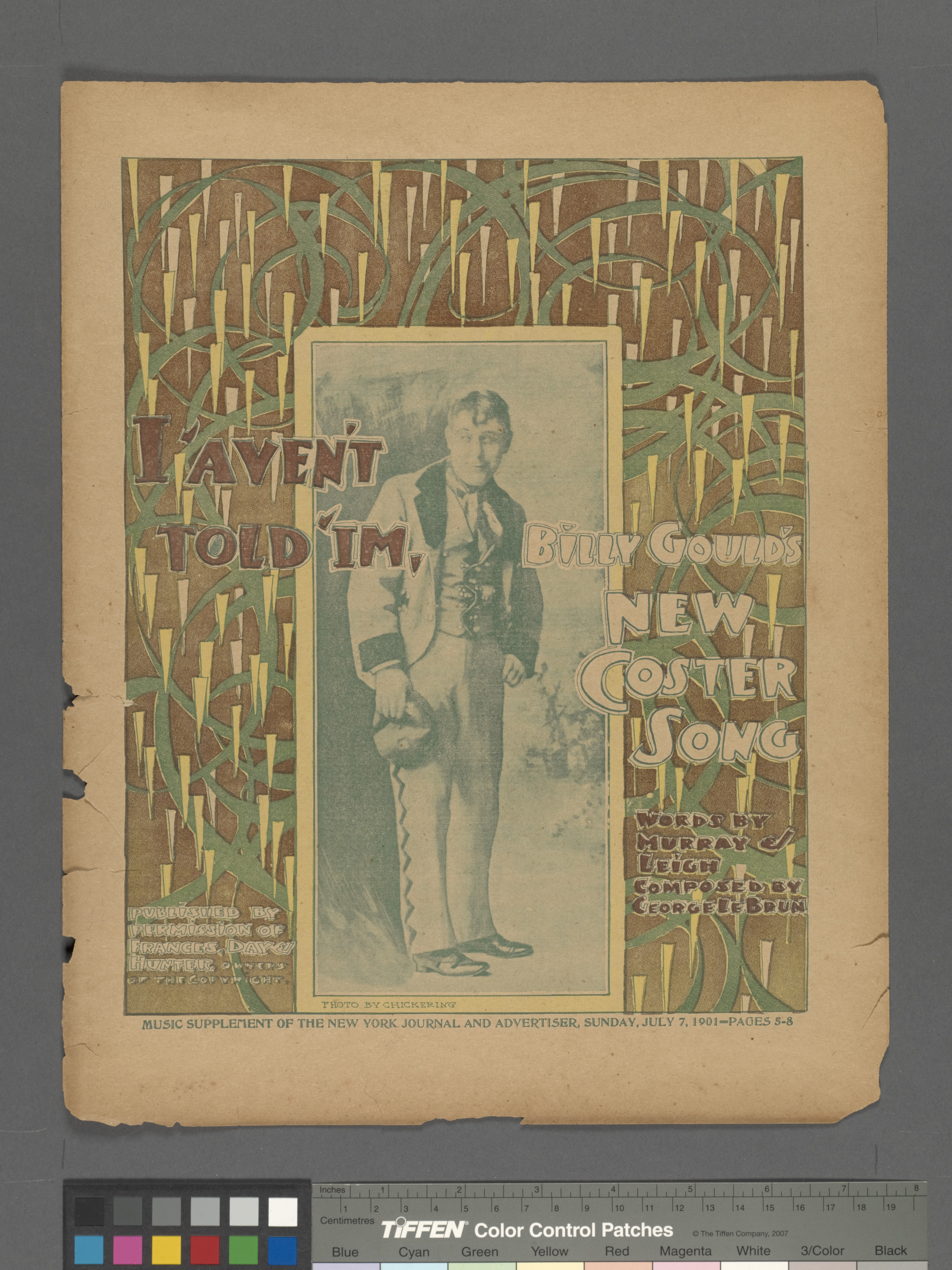
Cover of I 'aven't told 'im

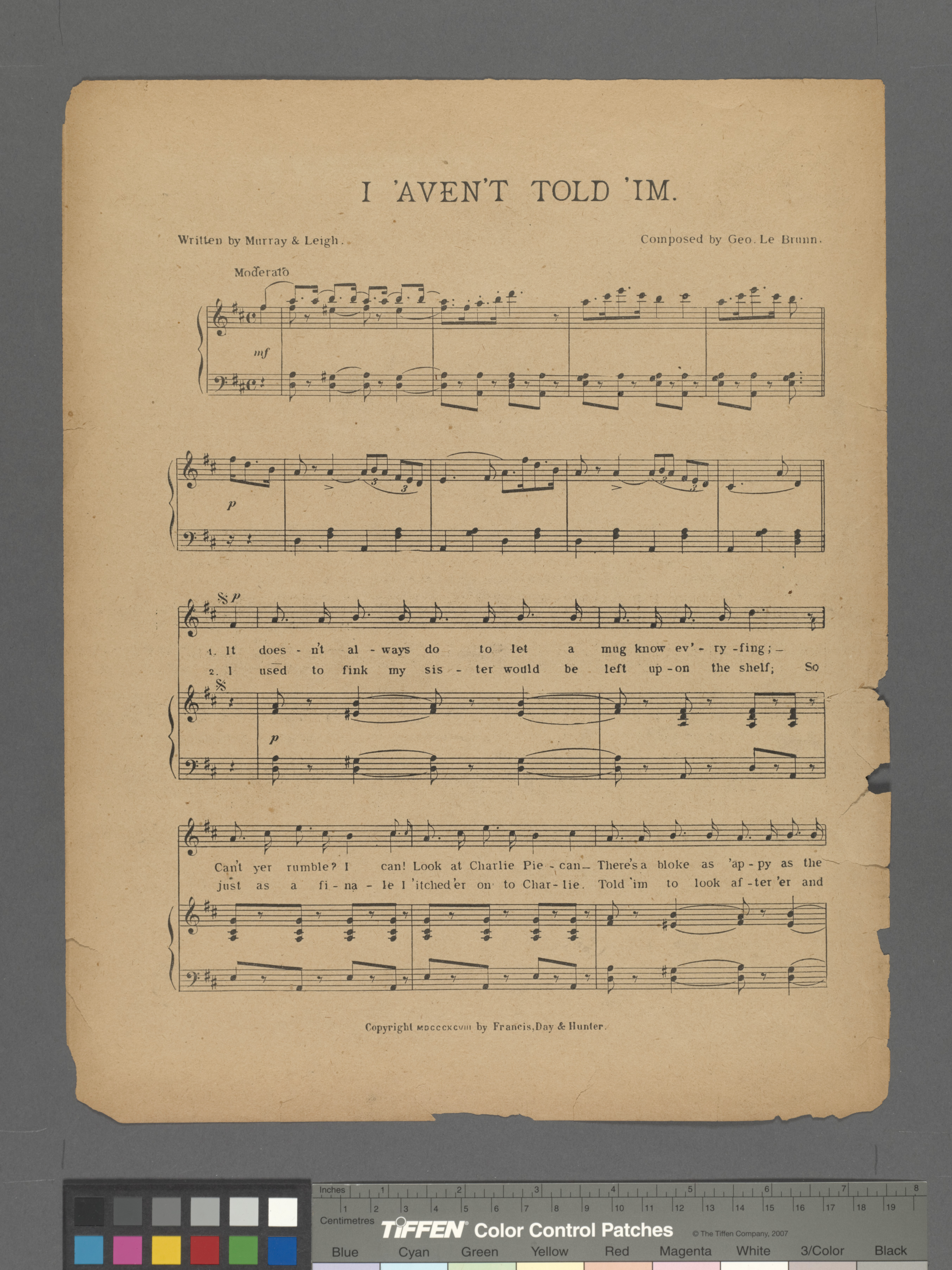
Opening bars of I 'aven't told 'im

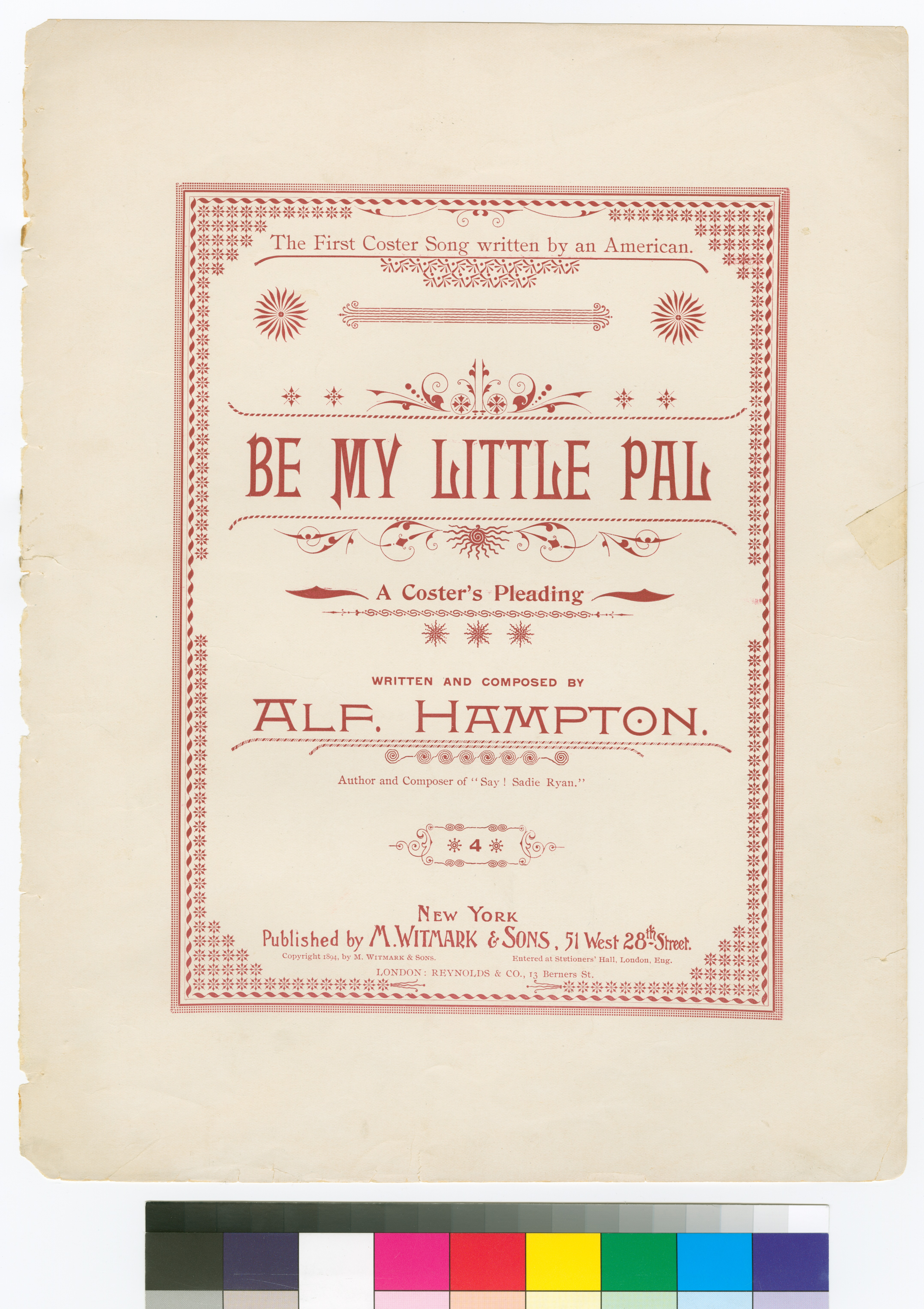
Cover of Be My Little Pal: A Coster's Pleading

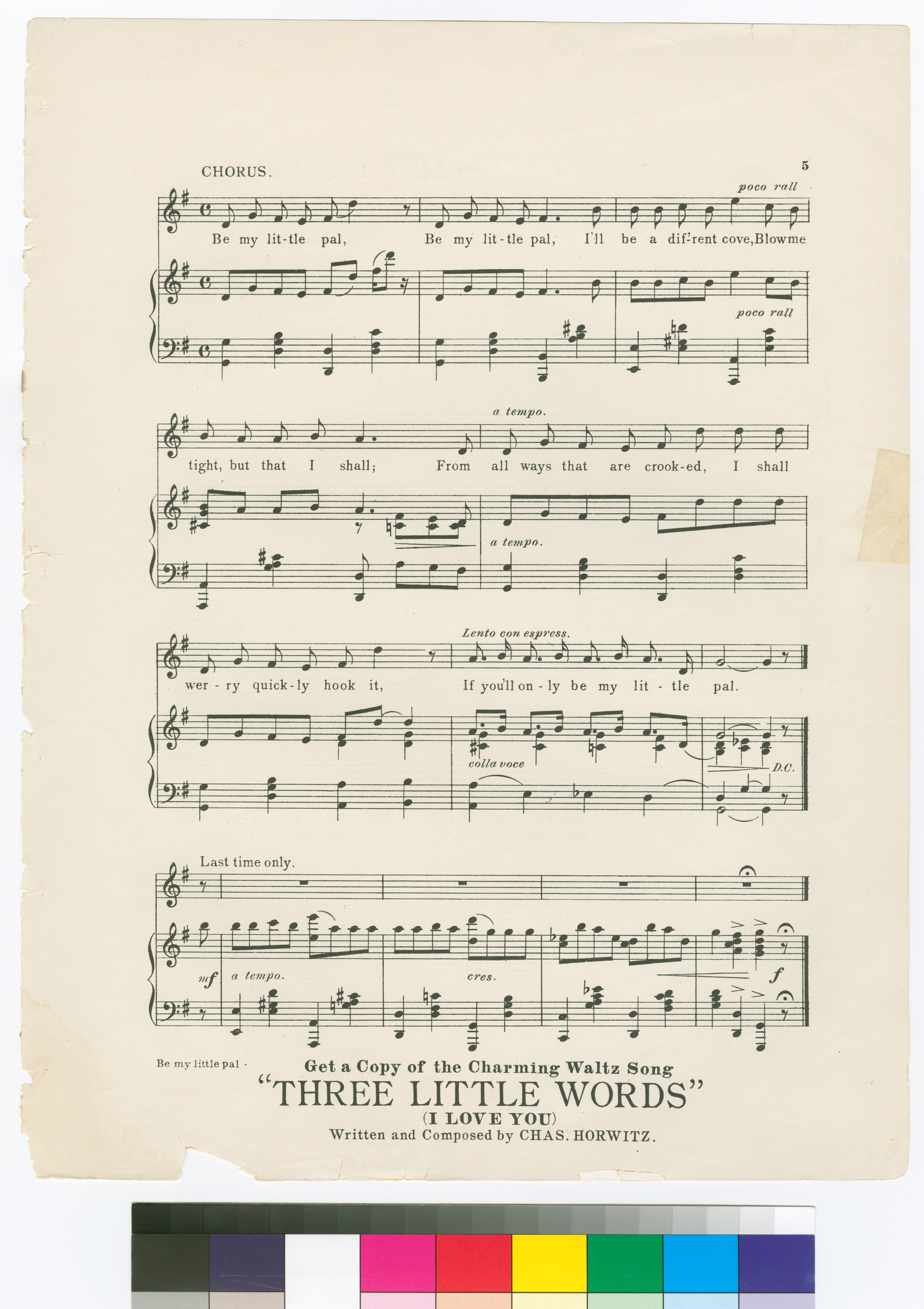
Chorus of Be my little pal

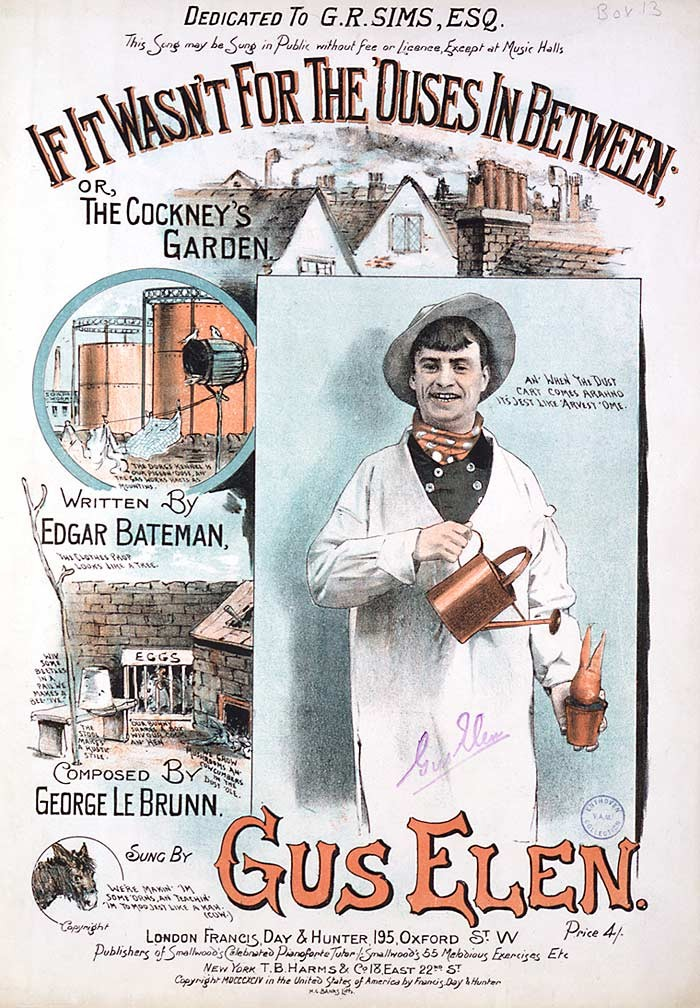
Cover of Gus Elen's If It Wasn't for the 'Ouses In Between also known as The Cockney's Garden

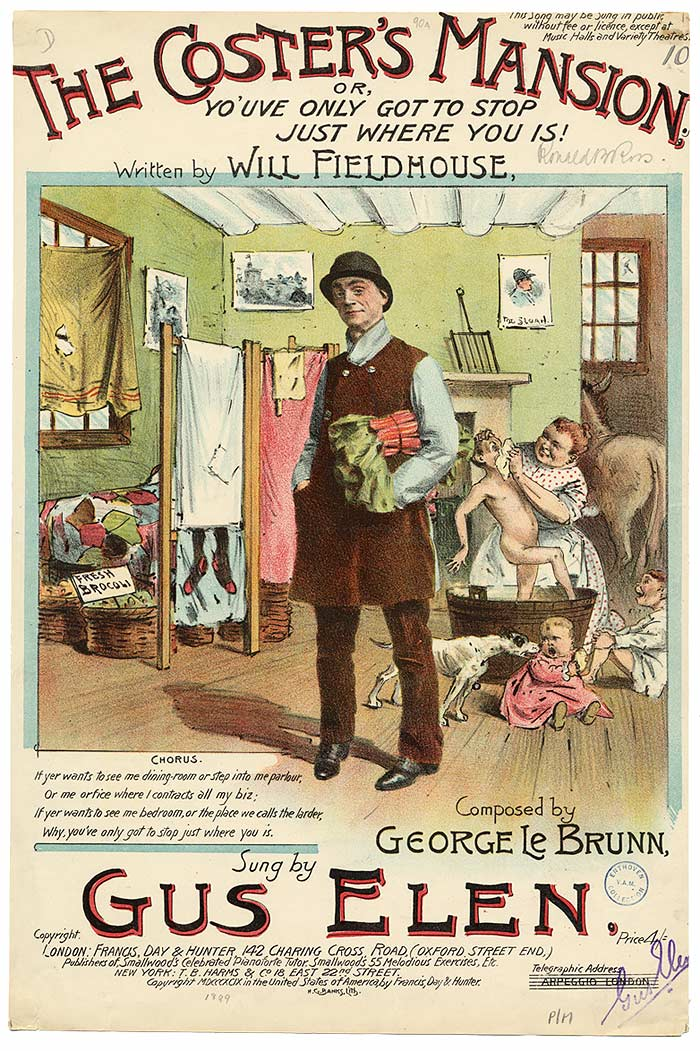
Cover of Gus Elen's The Coster's Mansion, 1899

Specific references to costermongers can be found in the novels and plays of the 17th century. Shakespeare, in the play, King Henry IV, (published about 1600) wrote that "virtue is of so little regard in these coster-monger times, that true valor is turned bear-heard." The playwright, Ben Jonson mentioned costermongers in Epicœne, or The Silent Woman, written in about 1609. The character, Morose, a man who craved silence, could "not endure the costermonger" and "swoons if he hears one." Playwrights, John Ford and Thomas Dekker, also mentioned costers in The Sun's Darling (1656) in the passage, "Upon my life, he means to turn costermonger, and is projecting how to forestall the market. I shall cry "pippins" rarely." A popular comedy, The Scornful Lady (1616), written by playwrights, Francis Beaumont and John Fletcher, referred to costers in: "Pray sister, do not anger him, And, then he'll rail like a rude costermonger."

From the 15th century, a tradition of representing ‘street cries’ developed in Europe and reached a peak in 18th and 19th century London and Paris. These works were primarily folios consisting of sets of engravings or lithographs with minimal notation. Nevertheless, these representations have proved to be a valuable source for social historians. One of the first such publications was a French publication, Etudes Prises Dans let Bas Peuple, Ou Les Cris de Paris (1737) (roughly translated as Studies Taken of the Lower People, Or The Cries of Paris). Two decades later, in England, The Cries of London Calculated to Entertain the Minds of Old and Young; illustrated in variety of copper plates neatly engrav'd with an emblematical description of each subject, was published. and followed by Cries of London (1775) and The Cries of London, as they are daily exhibited in the streets: with an epigram in verse, adapted to each. Embellished with sixty-two elegant cuts (1775); a highly popular publication with a new edition published in 1791 and in its tenth edition by 1806. Other 18th-century titles included: The Cries of London: for the Instruction of Good Children; decorated with twenty-four cuts from life, (1795). Similar titles appeared in the 19th century including: The New Cries of London; with characteristic engravings (1804); The Cries of London; embellished with twelve engravings, The Cries of Famous London Town: as they are exhibited in the streets of the metropolis: with twenty humorous prints of the most eccentric characters; The Cries of London: shewing how to get a penny for a rainy day, (1820) Lord Thomas Busby's The Cries of London: drawn from life; with descriptive letter-press, in verse and prose (1823); James Bishop's The Cries of London: for the information of little country folks; embellished with sixteen neatly-coloured engravings, (1847); and The London Cries in London Street: embellished with pretty cuts, for the use of good little boys and girls, and a copy of verses (1833).

From the 18th through to the early 20th century, music hall entertainers, songwriters and musicians mined coster culture and language, seeking inspiration for parodies, sketches and songs. Alfred Peck Vance (1838–1888), also known as The Vance, was one of the first to exploit the coster image in the music halls. Arthur Lloyd was a composer and singer, who achieved great success with his character-songs in the 1870s, many of which were devoted to the lives of costermongers. Lloyd's repertoire, which included songs such as The Costermonger's Song, unlike other music hall compositions, was less dependent on the ability of the performer to mimic Cockney accents and mannerisms, but rather relied on the lyrics to deliver a "quaintness of fancy" and humour. Other musicians, such as Robert and Harris Weston, drew inspiration from London's cockney culture when composing their songs, some of which were often sung in a cockney accent. Coster life and culture was also portrayed in Victorian music halls by vocal comedians such as Albert Chevalier, Bessie Bellwood, Charles Seel, Paul Mill and Gus Elen. Elen was a highly popular performer whose tunes included; The Coster's Mansion, The Coster's Muvver and The Coster's Pony. Chevalier, was a popular comedic entertainer, who himself never worked as a coster, but appeared in character as a costermonger, and sang The Coster's Serenade, The Nasty Way 'e Sez It, and Funny Without Being Vulgar. A few costermongers, such as Alec Hurley, made a living composing and performing songs about their own careers as costermongers. The Costermonger's Song (also known as Going to the Derby) was a Lloyd composition. Hurley's wife, Marie Lloyd, had some success with tunes he composed including, The Coster's Christening and the Costermonger's Wedding. Many of these were pictorial texts, heavily adorned with engravings or lithographs depicting the exuberance of street life in which street vendors were prominently featured.

Selected engravings from works of non-fiction on the theme of costermongers

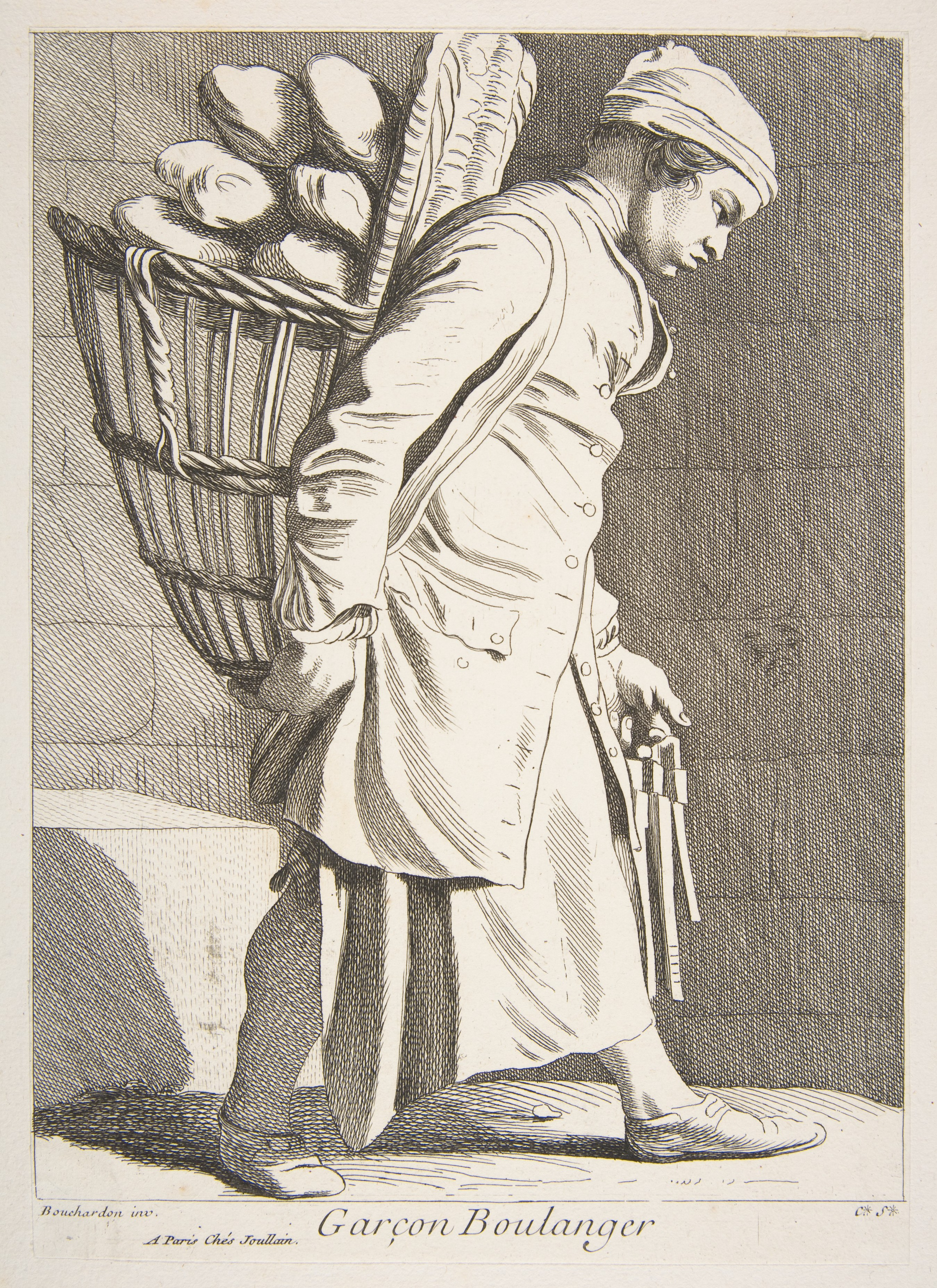
"Bread Boy" from Études prises dans le bas peuple ou les Cris de Paris, 1746

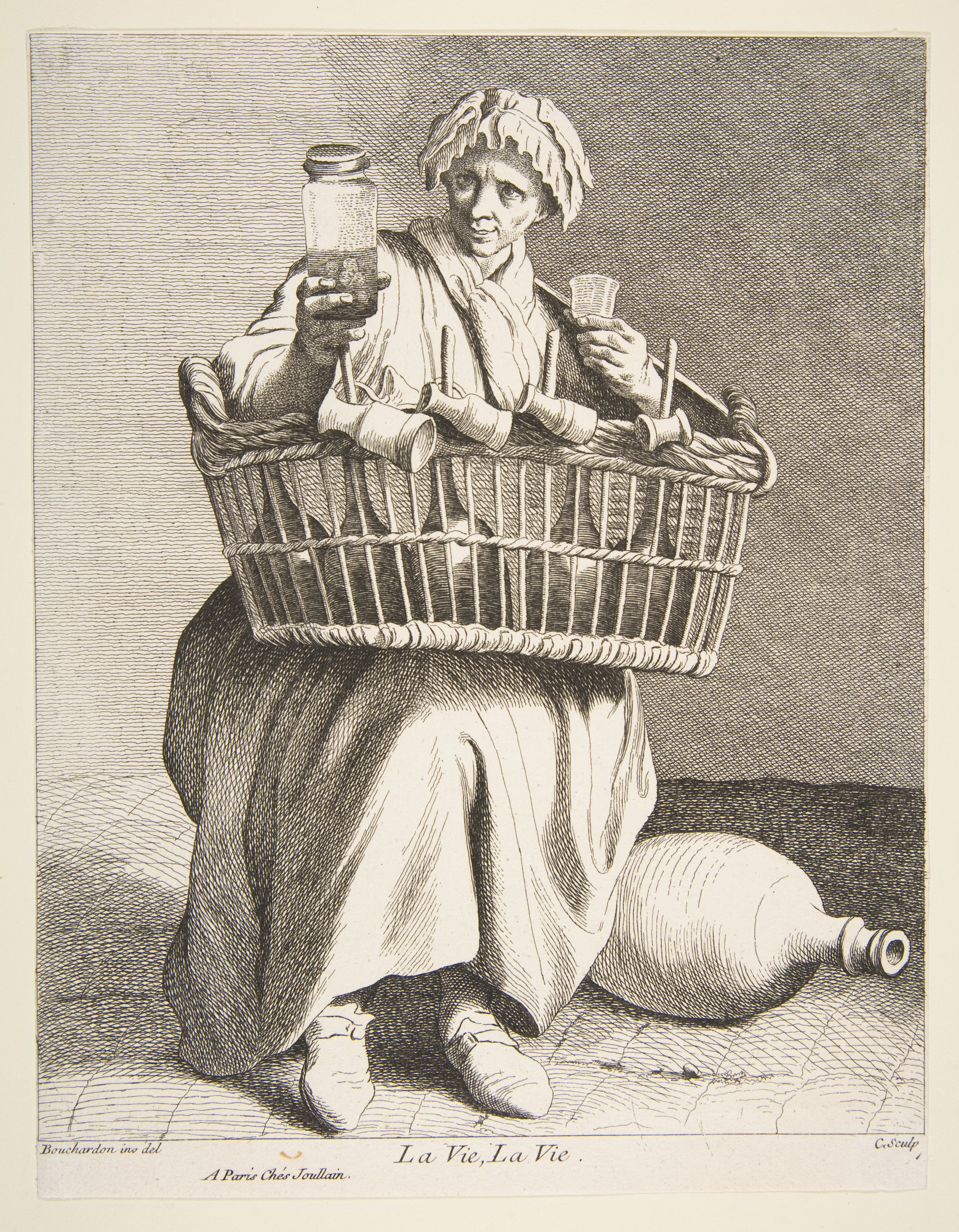
"Brandy Seller" from Études prises dans le bas peuple ou les Cris de Paris, 1746

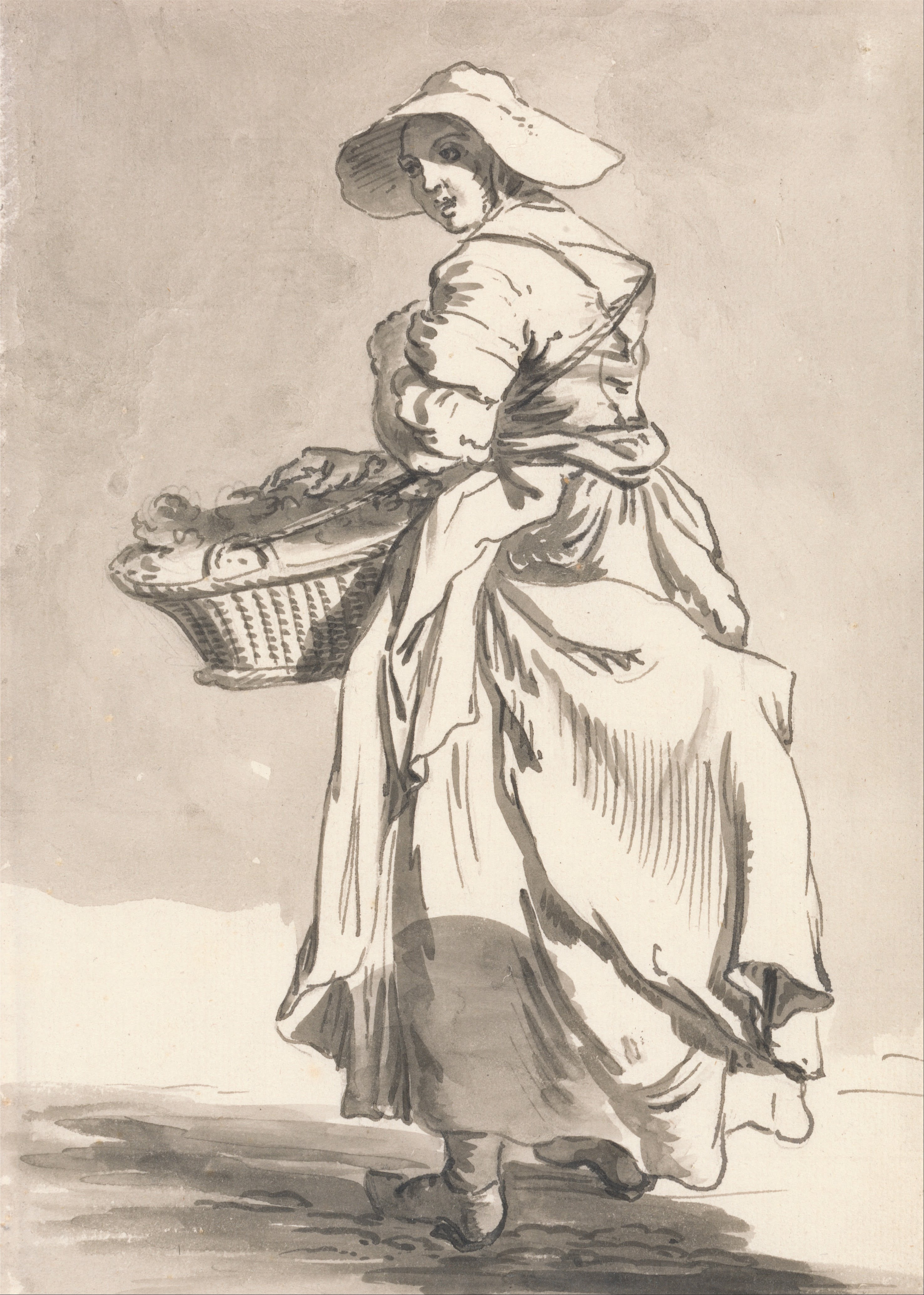
Flower seller from the London Cries series by Paul Sandby, c. 1770

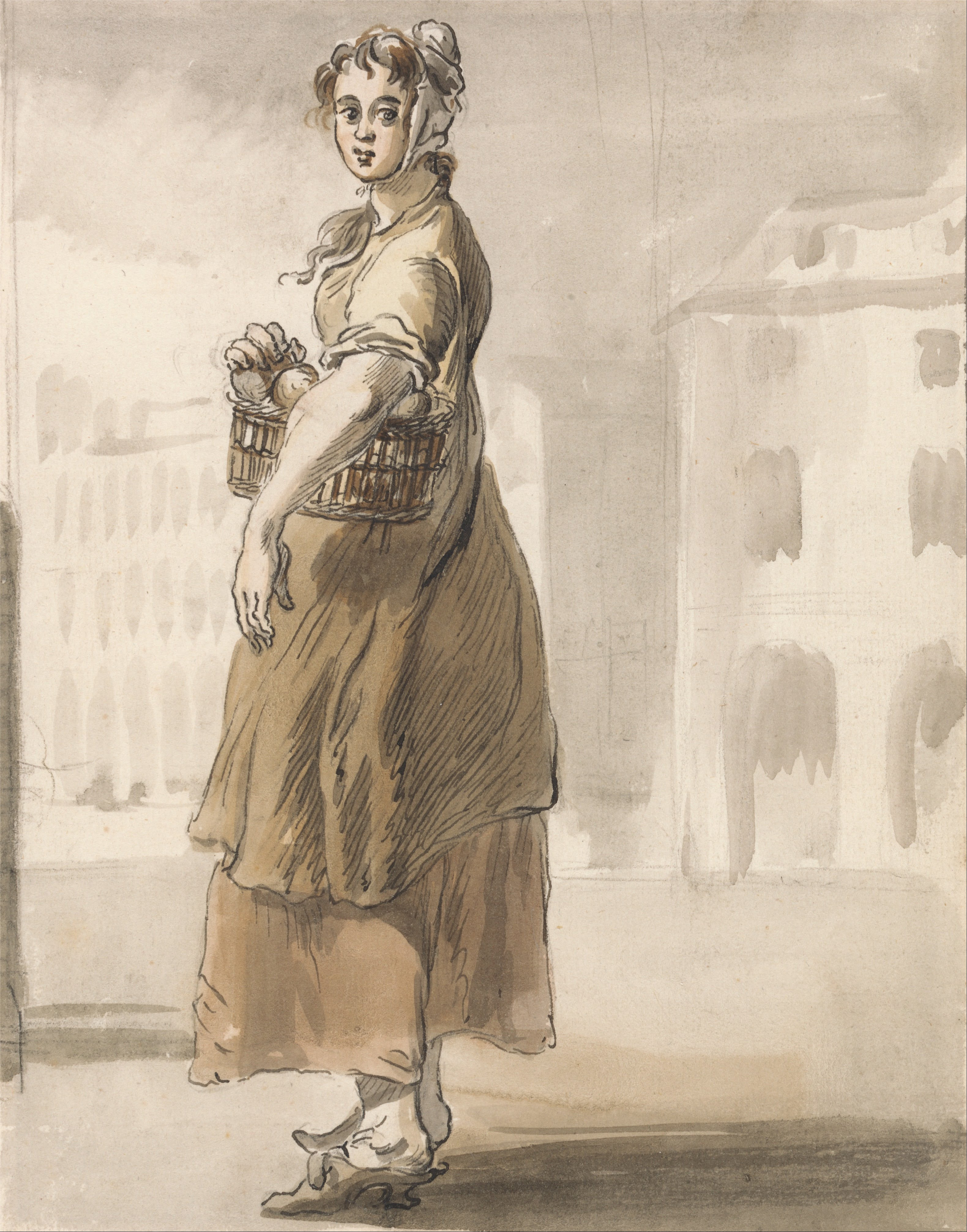
"Girl with a Basket of Oranges" from the London Cries series by Paul Sandby, c. 1770

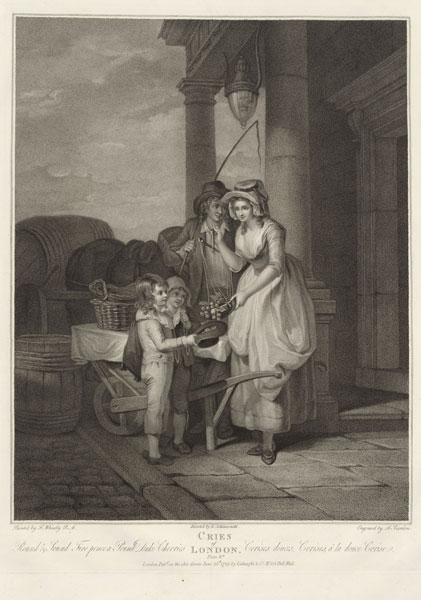
"Round & Sound Five Pence Pound Duke Cherries" from the Cries of London, by Anthony Cardon, 1795

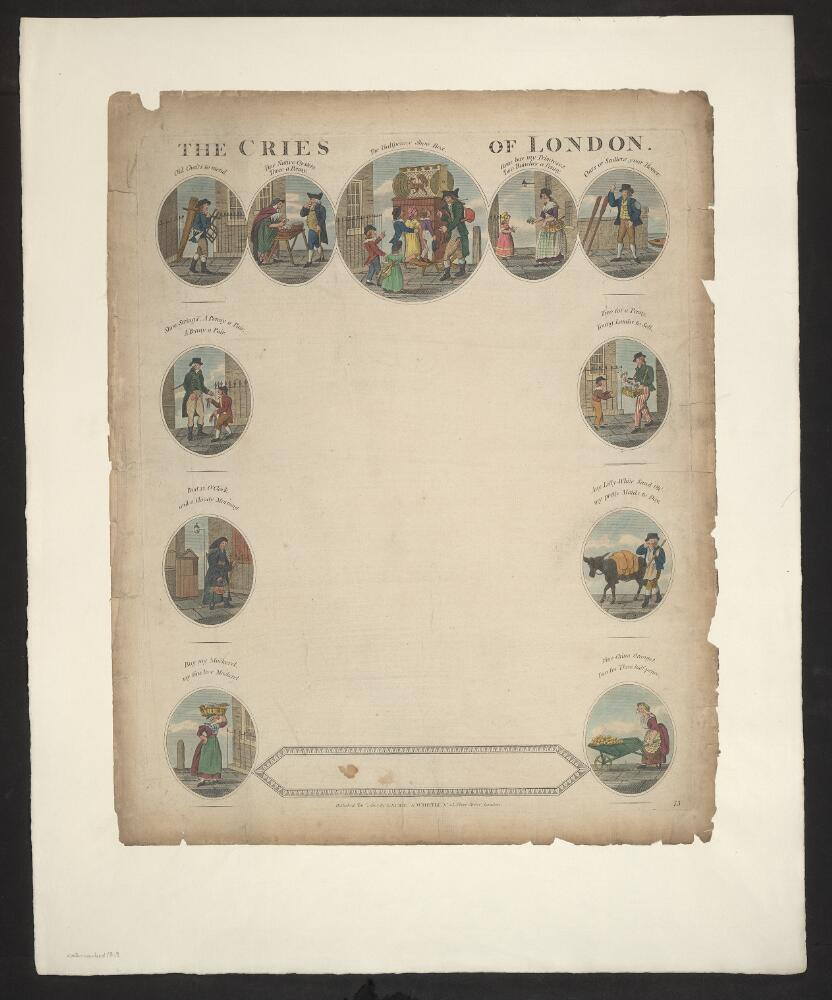
Images from Cries of London, by Robert Laurie and James Whittle, c. 1802

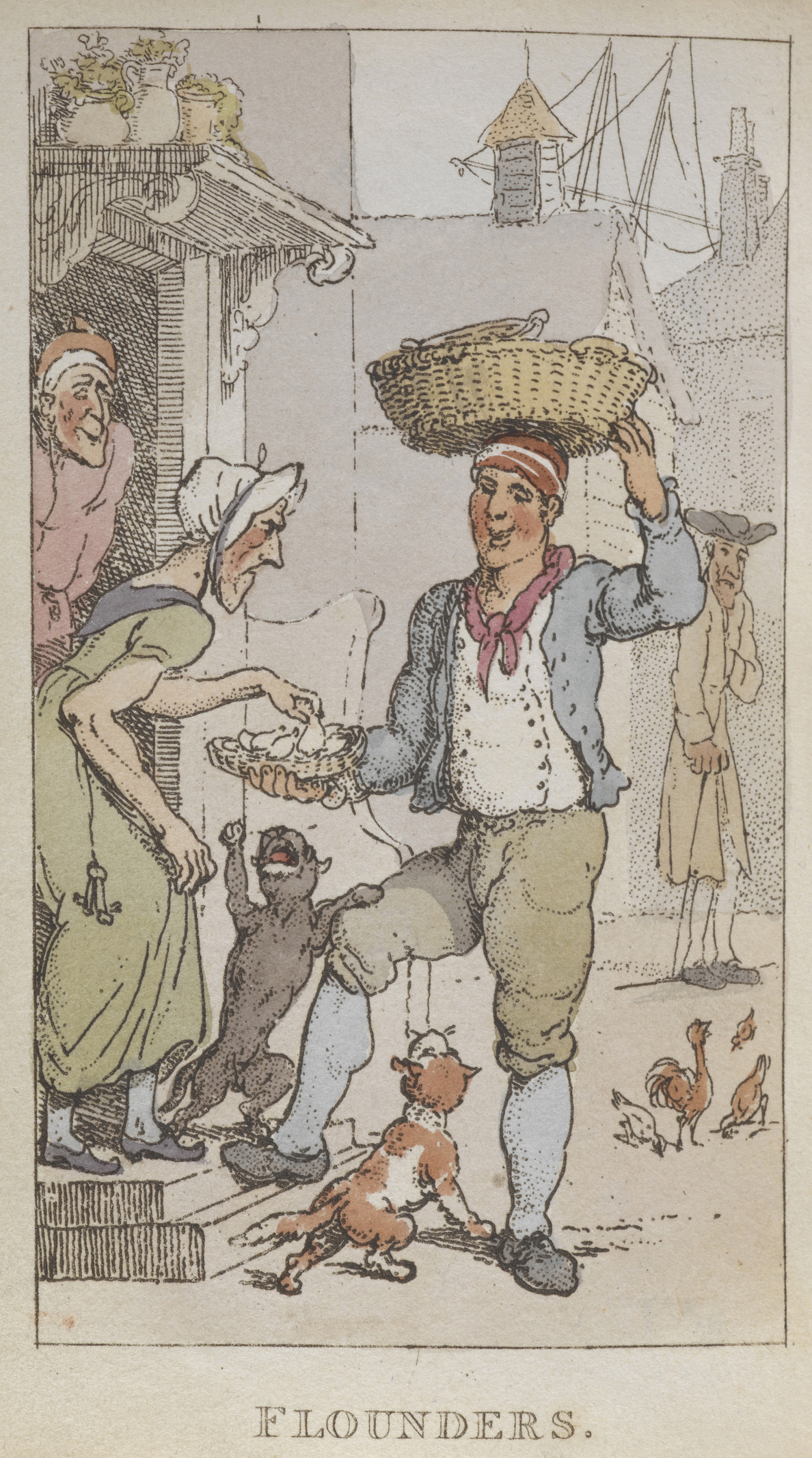
"Flounders: Selling fish" from Rowlandson's Characteristic Sketches of the Lower Orders, 1820

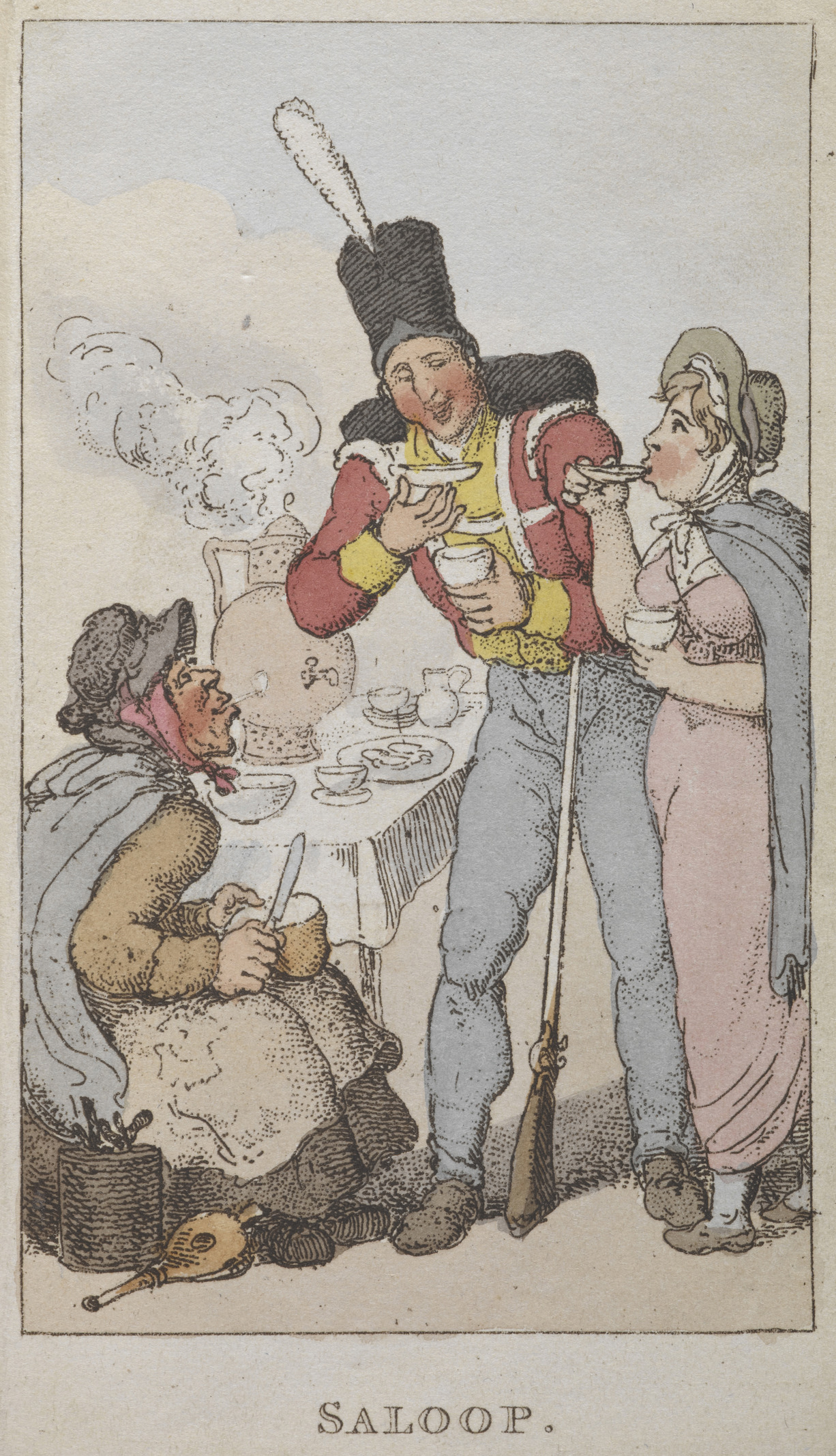
"Saloop" from Rowlandson's Characteristic Sketches of the Lower Orders, 1820

By the 19th century, writers were using known coster locations as settings for literary works. George Gissing's first published novel, Workers in the Dawn, published in 1880, described the costermongers at Whitecross Market in the late 1850s. In The Forsyte Saga, Swithin Forsyte is driving Irene Forsyte in his carriage through the streets of London in 1886 and a costermonger (the "ruffian") and his girlfriend are riding alongside in their donkey cart, which is overturned in traffic. Gilbert Chesterton points out that slum novels, an early 20th-century genre, showed a great interest in costermongers, although Chesterton, himself, wrote he did not always approve of the novelists' motives which often came down to writing about the costermonger's "dim vices and delicate virtues" and their capacity to create a sensation.

In the 1972 animated television film Oliver and the Artful Dodger, a reformed Artful Dodger works as a costermonger dealing in scrap iron to support a group of orphans he's rescued from the workhouse.

Composer Lucian Berio devised Cries of London in two versions (1973 & 1976) for vocal ensembles.

Jeffrey Archer's 1991 novel As the Crow Flies features a costermonger mentoring his grandson in the trade in the Covent Garden area of London.

Street life and the "cries of London" was also a recurring theme in European painting. In the mid-1700s, the English water-colourist, Paul Sandby created a series entitled London Cries depicting English shopkeepers, stall-holders and itinerant street vendors. The Dutch engraver, Marcellus Laroon began working in London in the mid-1700s where he produced his most famous work, the series, The Cryes of London. The Flemish engraver and printmaker, Anthony Cardon, spent time in England in the 1790s where he produced a series of engravings of London's street sellers, known as the Cries of London. Francis Wheatley, the English painter, who had been born in Covent Garden and was well acquainted with London's street life, exhibited a series of artworks, also entitled Cries of London, between 1792 and 1795. Augustus Edwin Mulready, made his reputation by painting scenes of Victorian life which included street sellers, urchins, markets flower sellers. The French artist, Louise Moillon, noted for her still-life paintings, also used market scenes, costermongers, street vendors and green-grocers as subject matter in early 17th-century France.

The Victorian Slum (Victorian Slum House in the US) is a five part documentary, produced by the BBC in 2016, featuring a group of costermonger and tradesman families, living and working in London's East End between the 1860s and the early 20th century, and highlighting the plight of the urban poor.

Paintings, etchings and porcelain figurines featuring costermongers

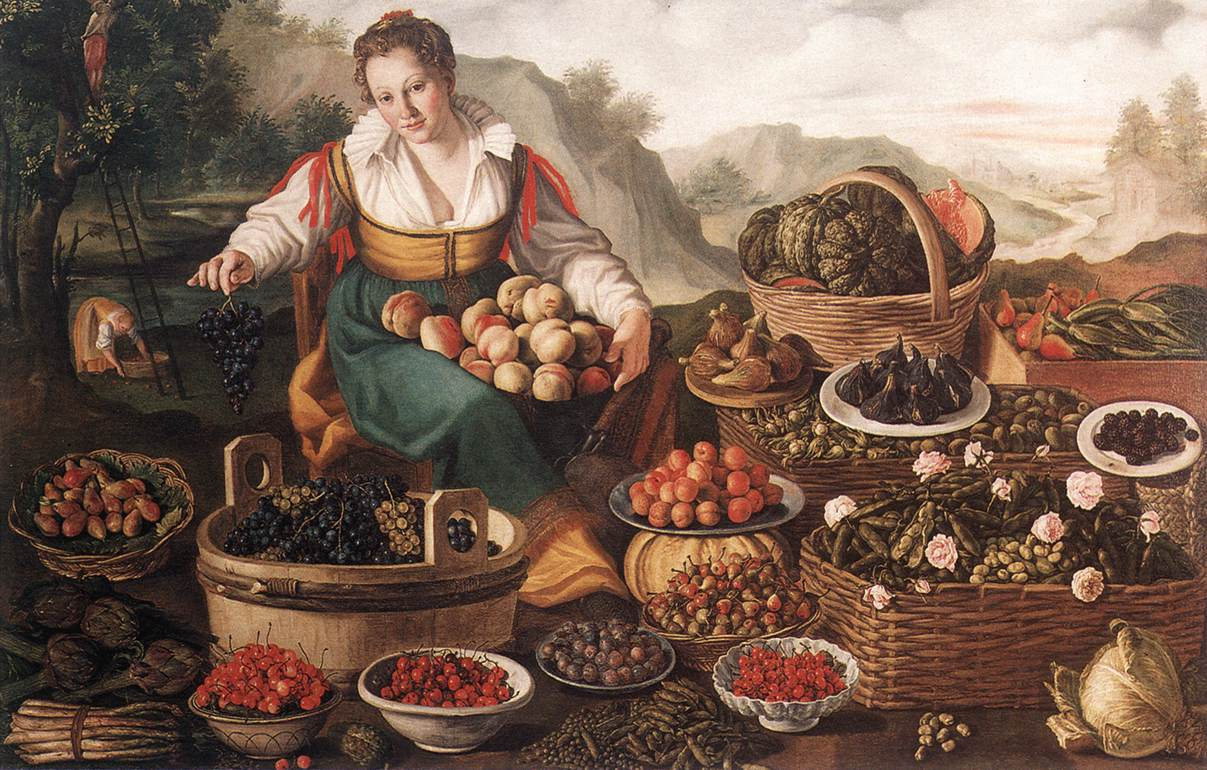
The Fruit Seller by Vincenzo Campi, c. 1580

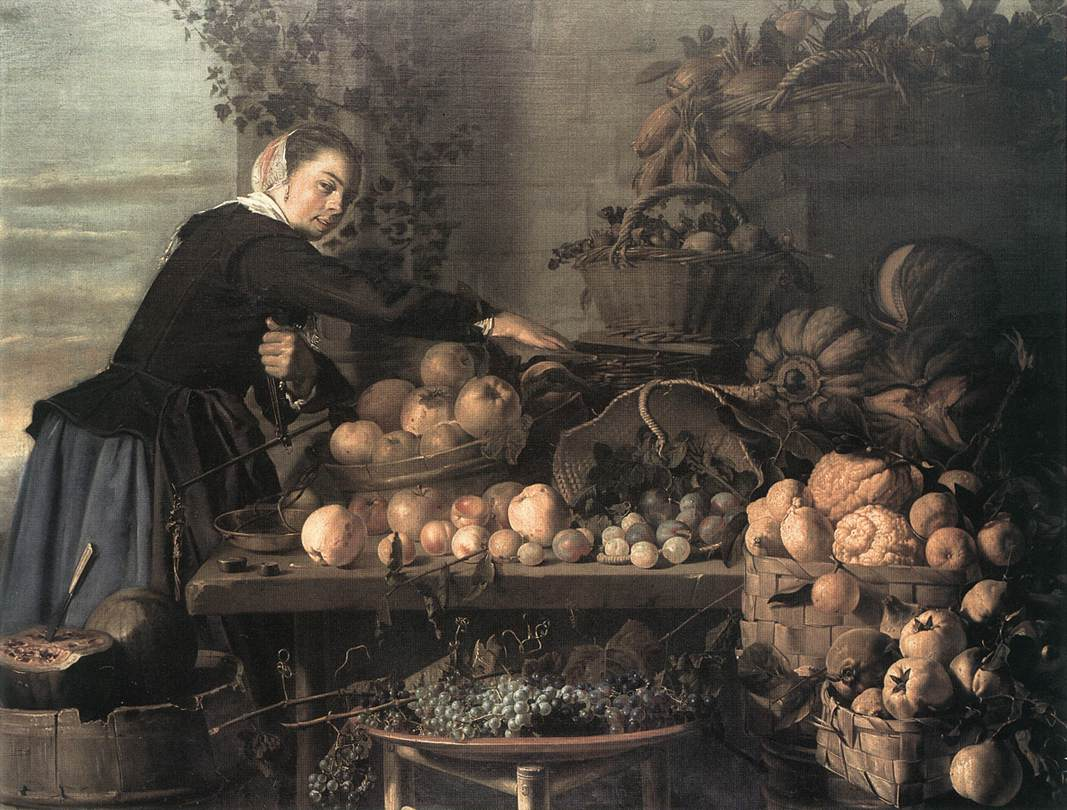
Fruit and Vegetable Seller by Claes van Heussen, 1630

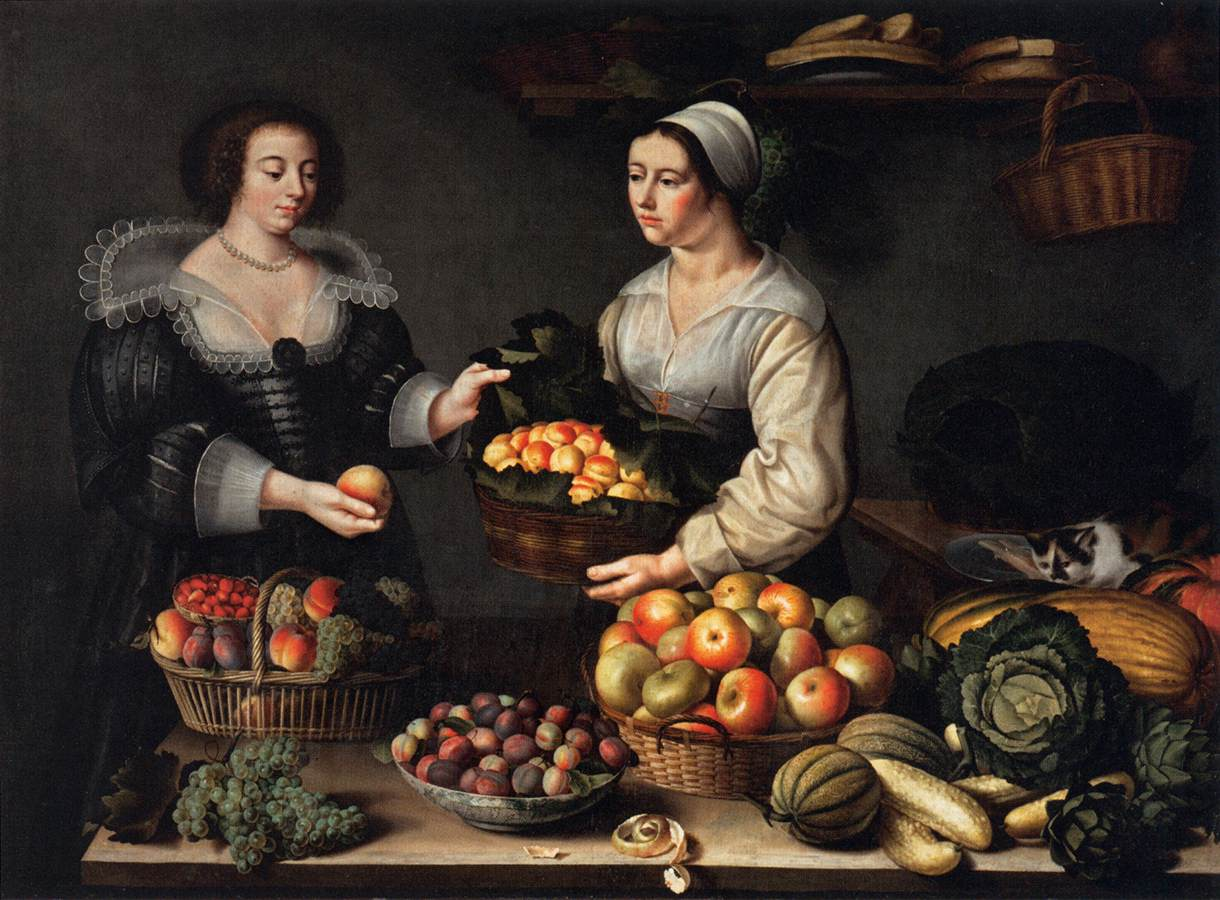
The Fruit and Vegetable Costermonger by Louise Moillon, 1631

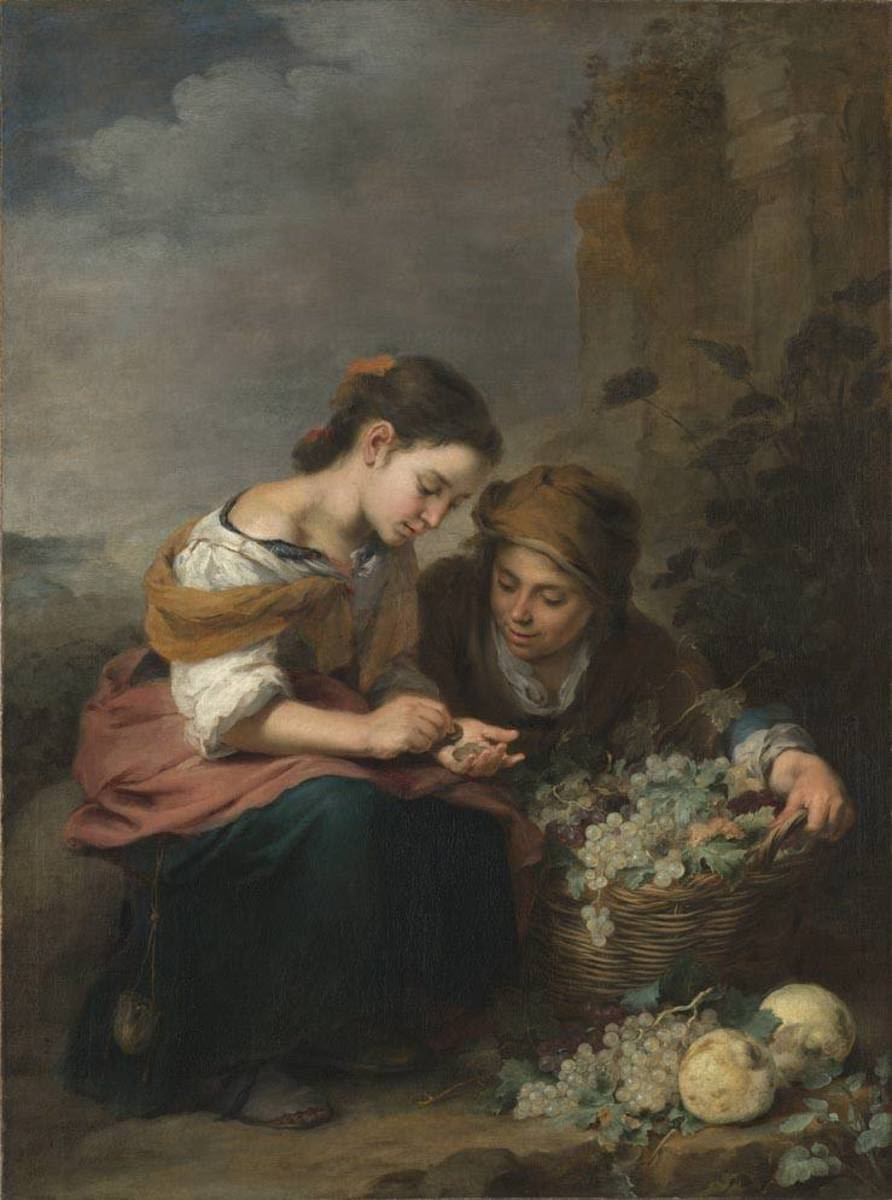
Fruit Vendors, by Murillo, 1670–75

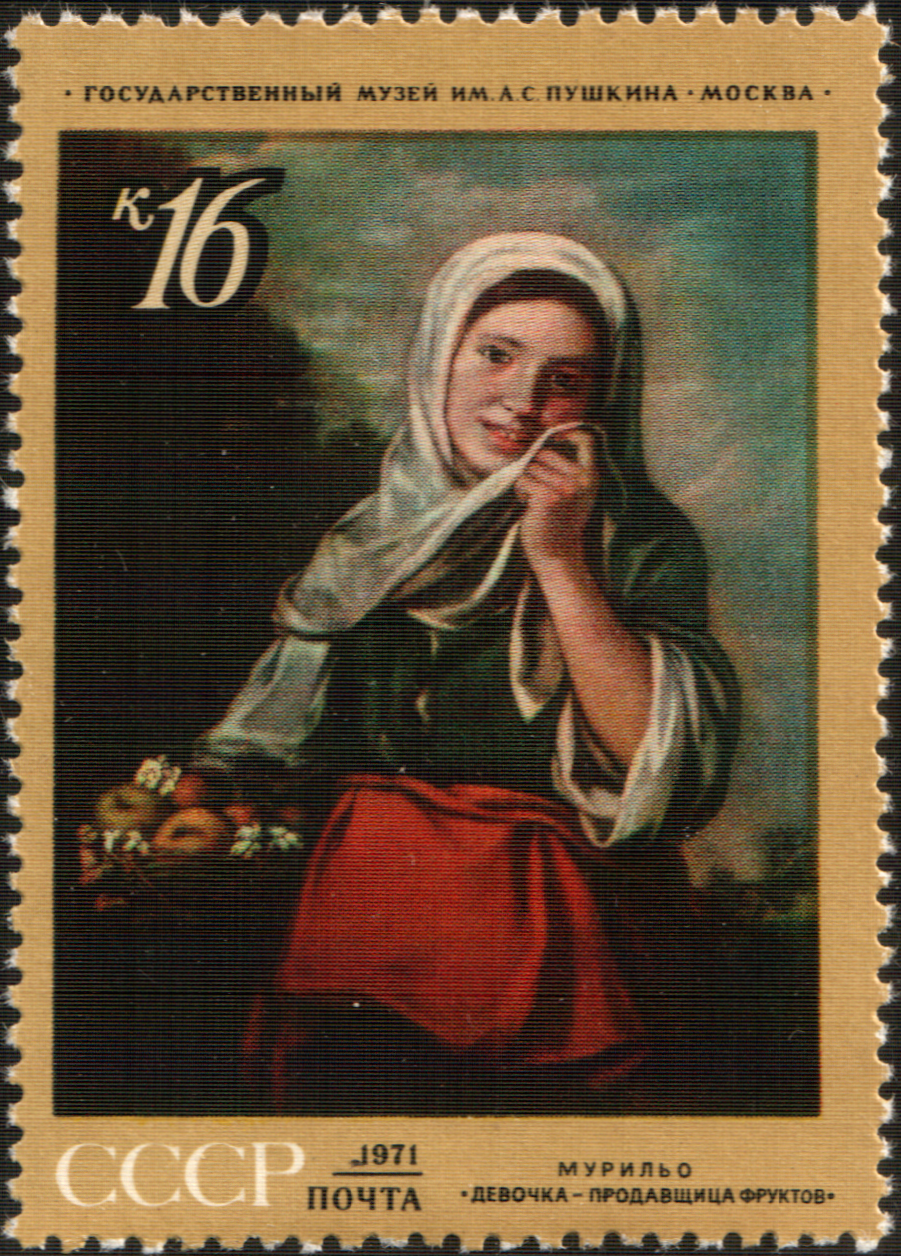
Girl Fruit-seller by Bartolome Esteban Murillo (1971 postage stamp, Russia)

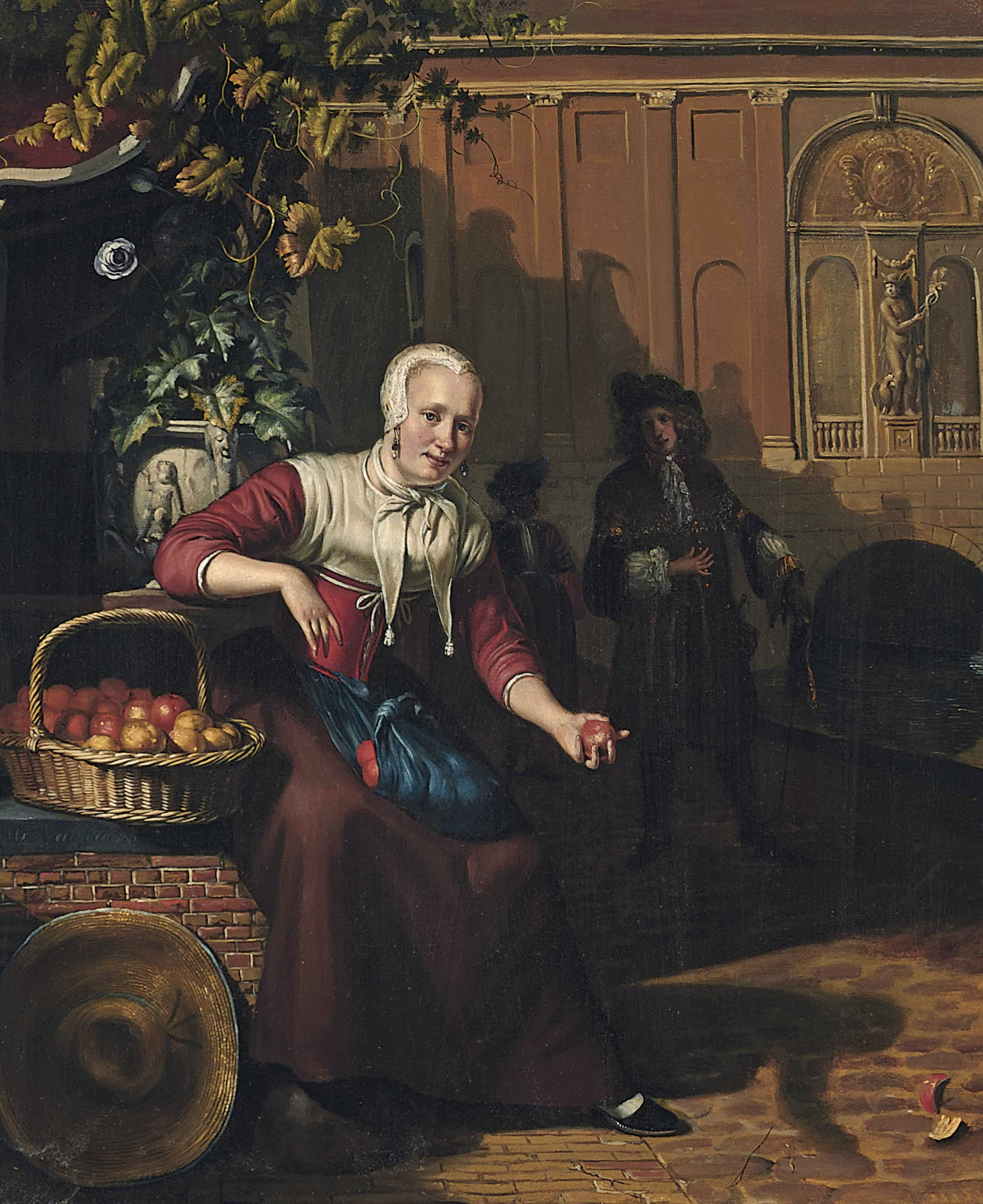
A fruit seller by a canal, by Matthys Naiveu, 1687

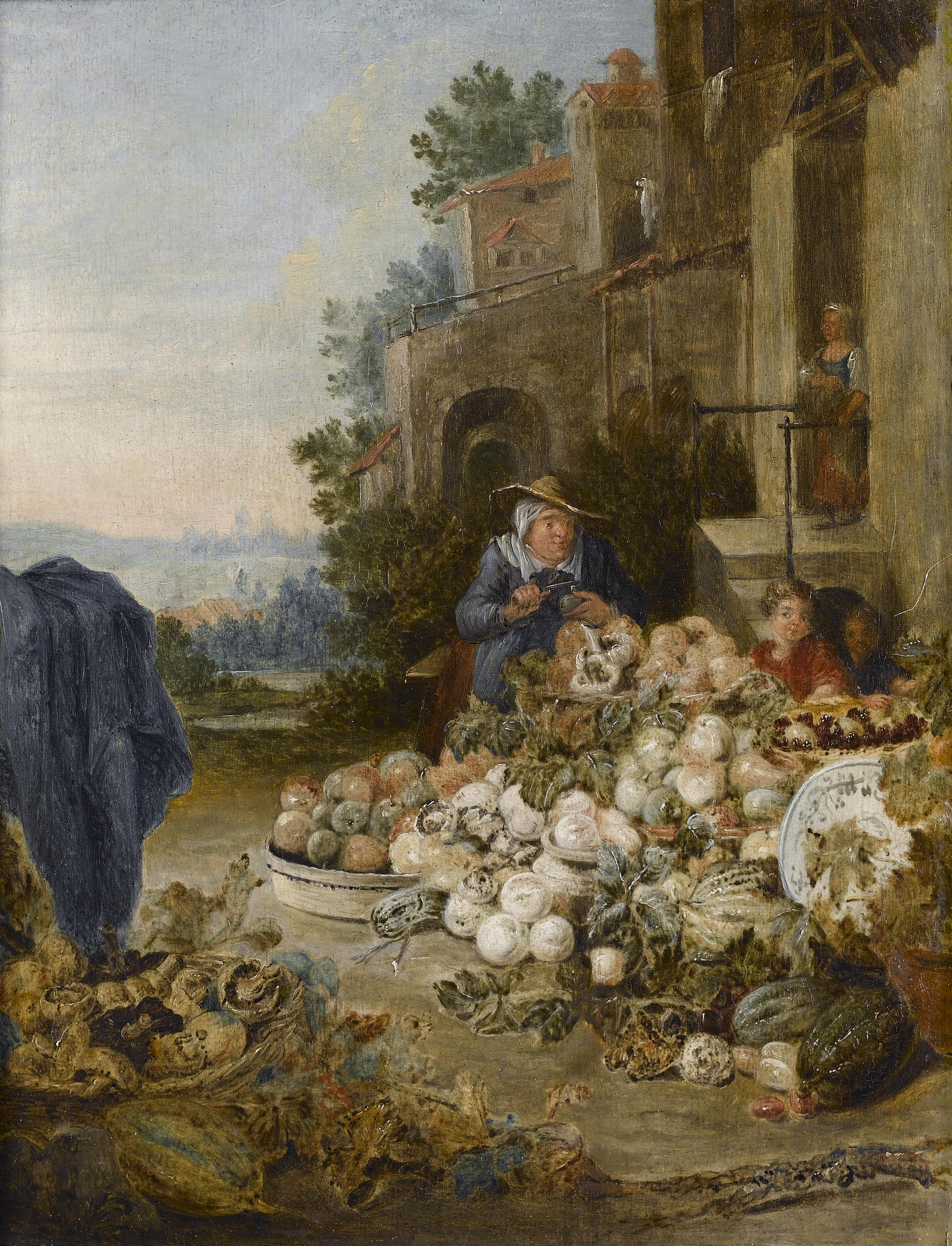
The fruit seller by Peter Angelis, early 18th century

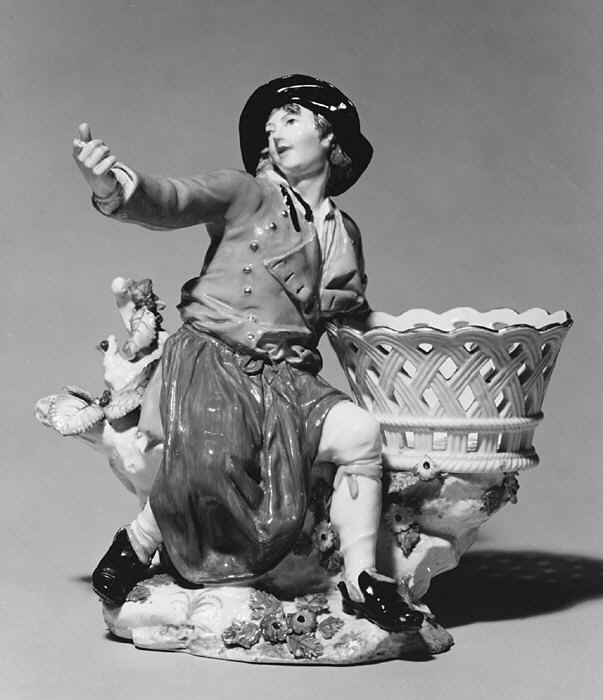
Fruit seller (one of a pair), Chelsea Porcelain Manufactory, figurine, c. 1755

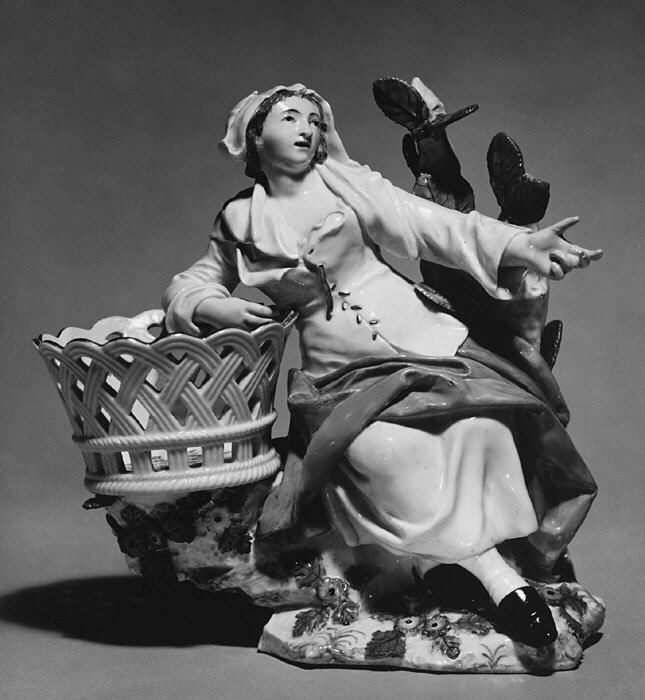
Fruit seller (one of a pair), Chelsea Porcelain Manufactory, figurine, c. 1755

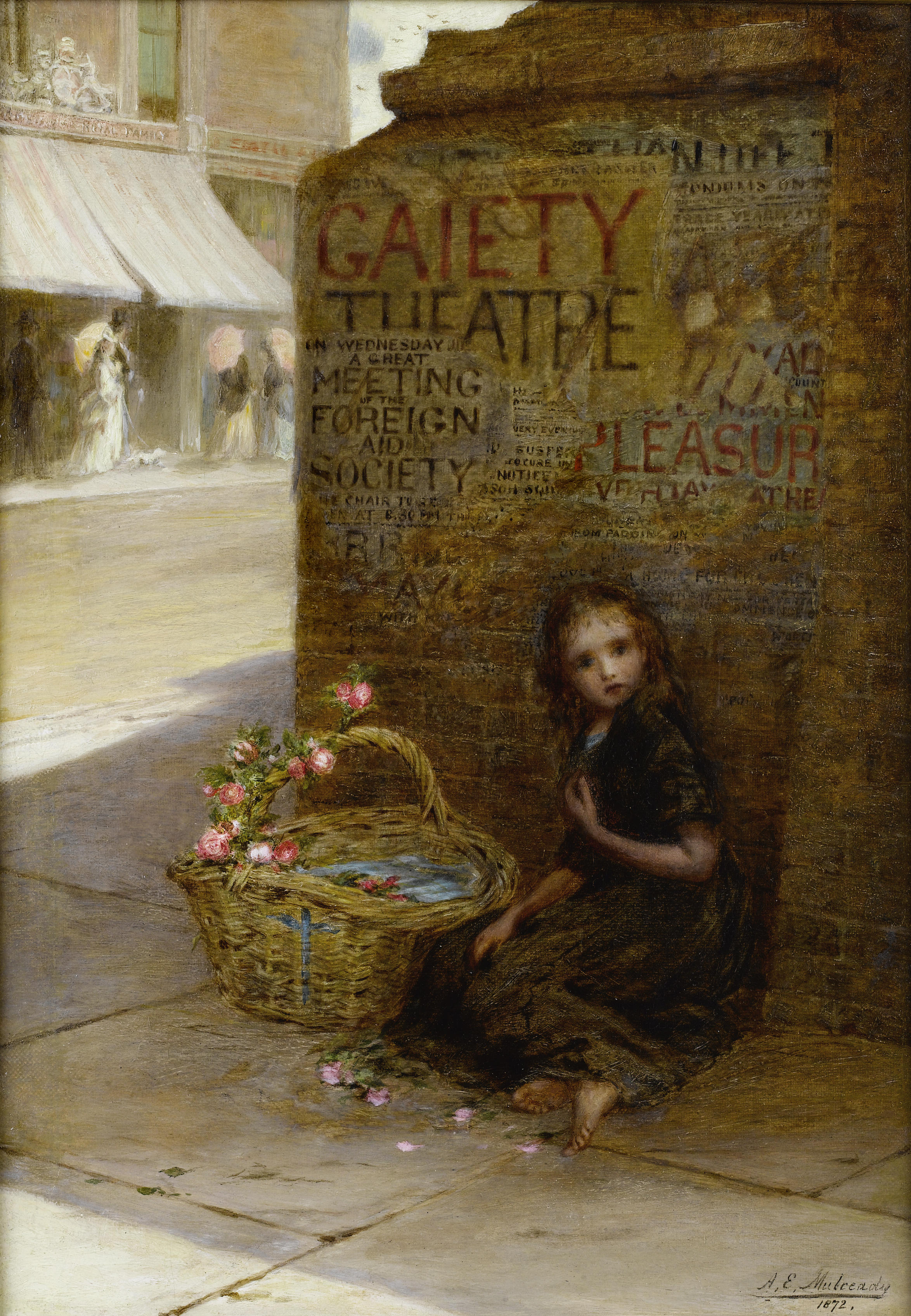
The flower girl by Augustus Edwin Mulready, 1872

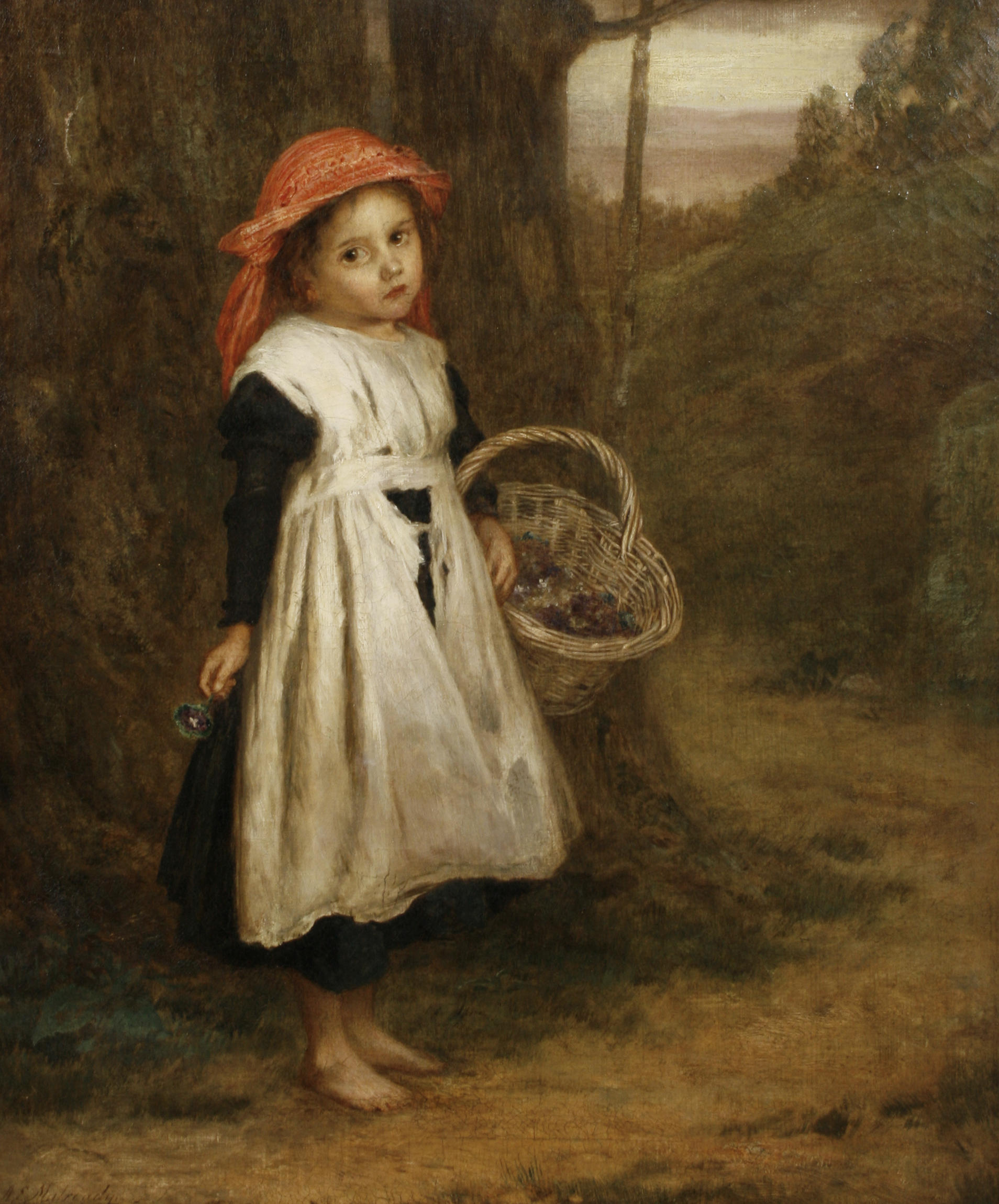
A Little Violet Seller by Augustus Edwin Mulready, 1877

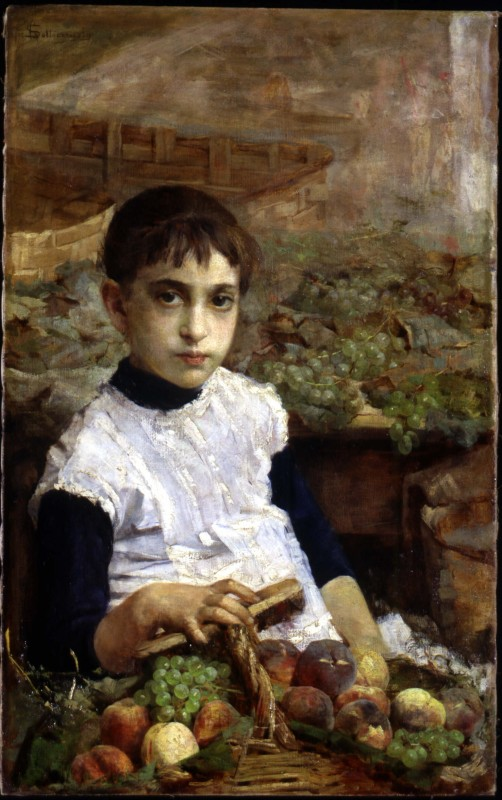
Fruit vendor by Sottocornola Giovanni, 1886

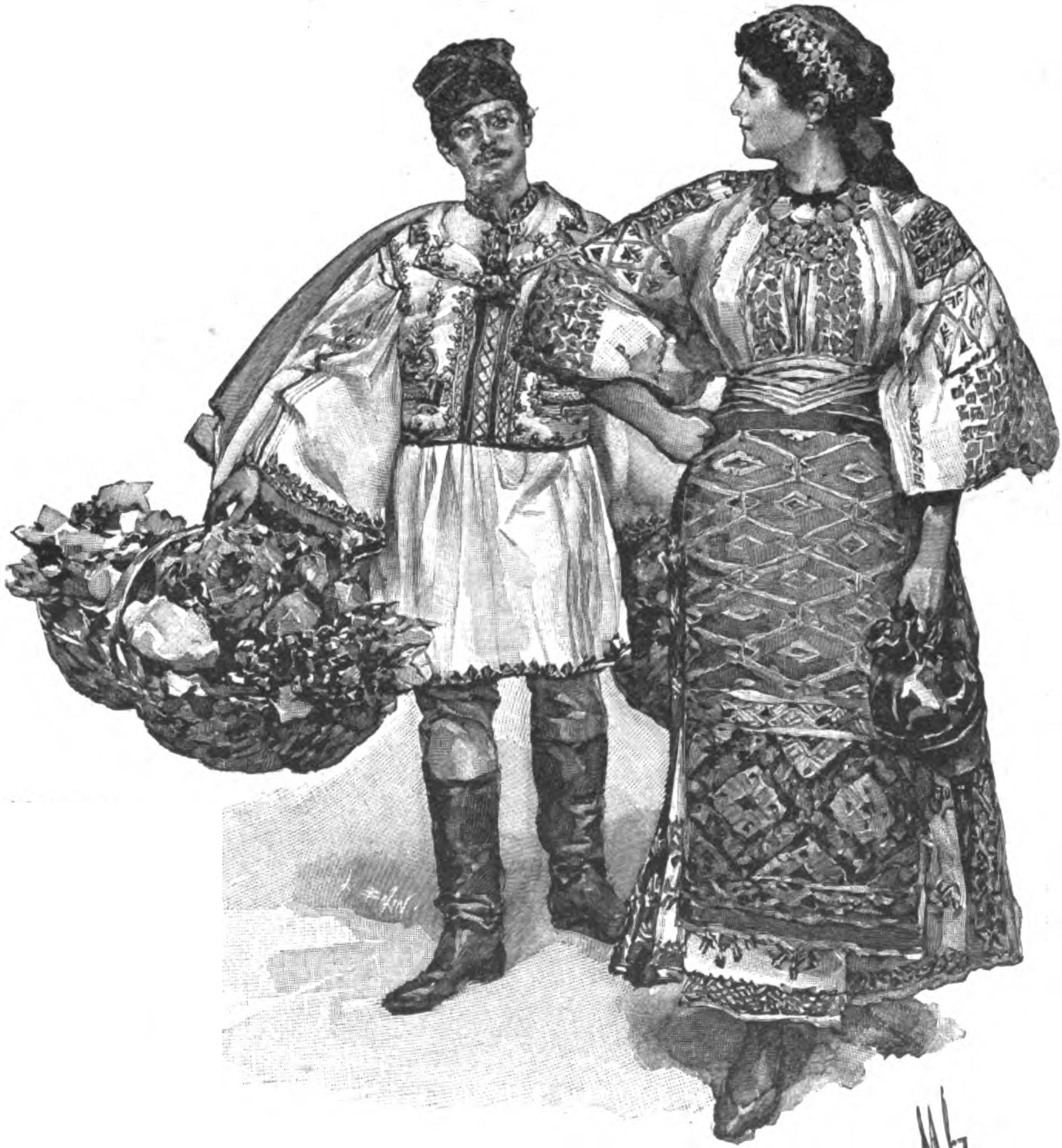
Peasant and Fruit-Seller, Bucharest, 1893

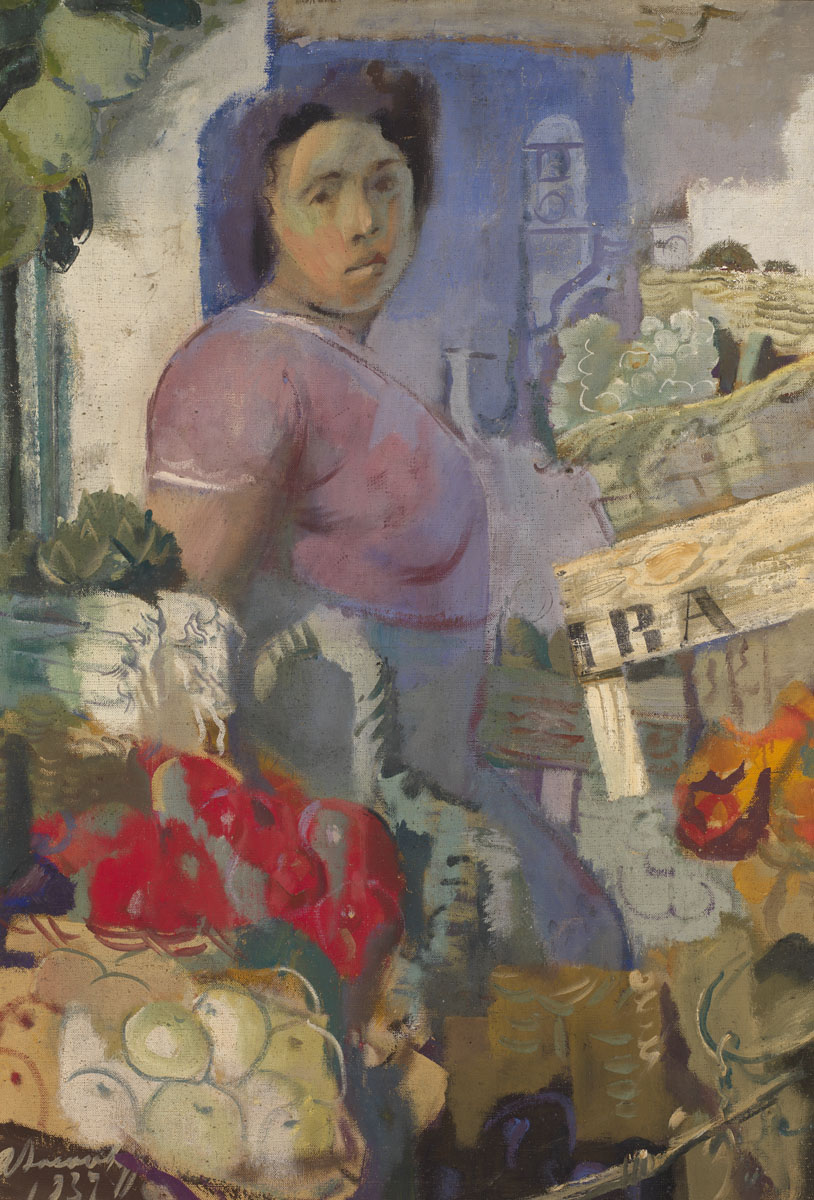
Fruit seller by A. Yakovkev, early 20th century

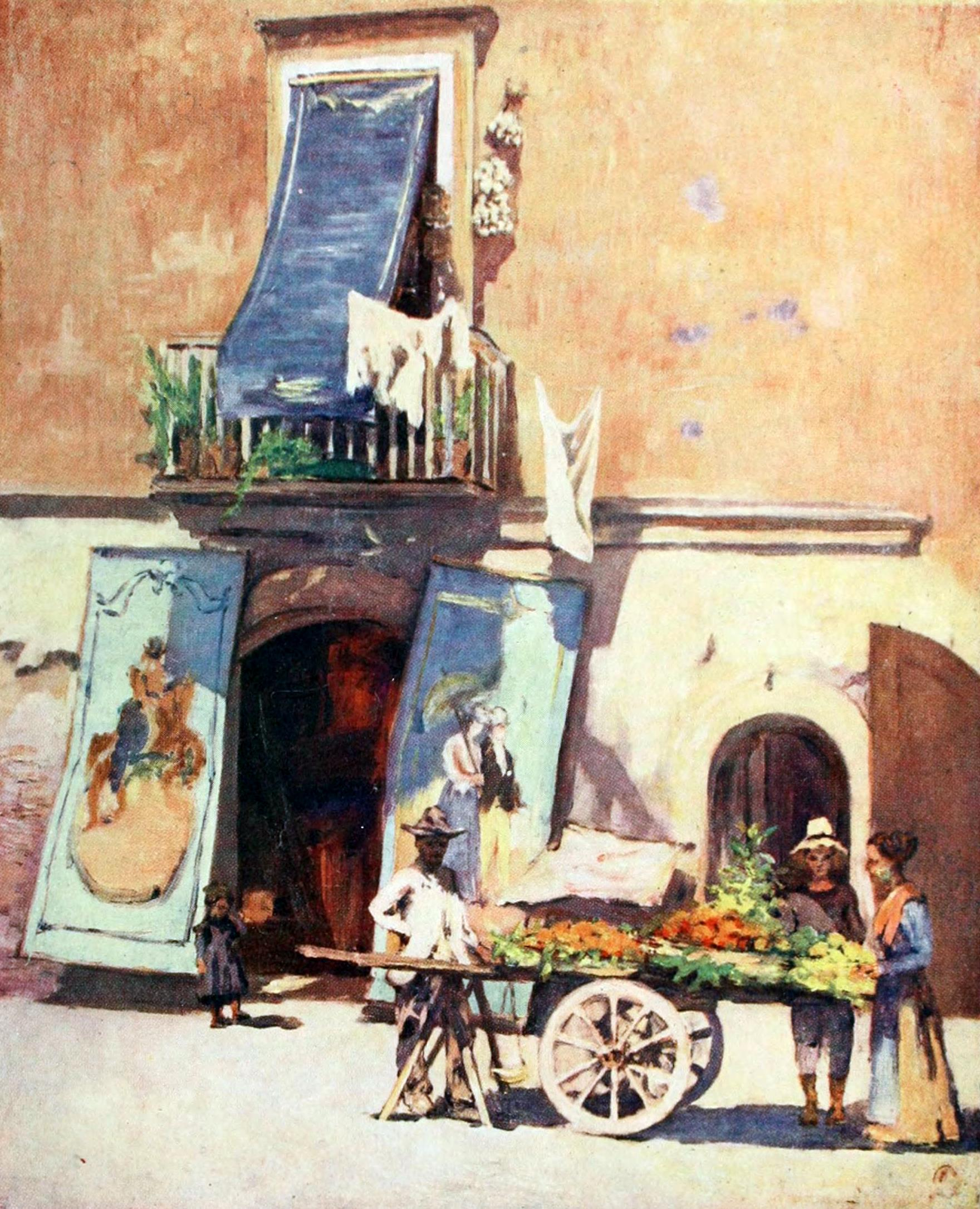
Fruit sellers in Naples, 1918

== Social commentary and sources ==
The activities and lifestyles of 19th-century costermongers and street vendors are among the subjects documented in various 19th-century texts. Many of these were written by prominent social commentators and journalists, as part of a social reform agenda which emerged during the period. Notable commentators (with selected book titles) include:

- Henry Mayhew wrote London Labour and the London Poor, a four volume collection of articles, being an observational account of street life and the working poor, published in 1851. Volume 1 is dedicated to costermongers and street vendors。Henry Mahew wrote extensively about the conditions of London's working classes and poor. During the mid-19th century, his output was prolific, publishing a series of 82 letters, surveying the conditions of the nation's labouring population in the Morning Chronicle in 1849-1850.; and a series of pamphlets, entitled "The Great World of London", in 1856 made a number of public appearances in which he used humour, song and costume to bring his characters to the stage and in 1857 gave a series of public readings, promoted as "Oddities of the London Streets" His most well-known work is London Labour and the London Poor
- Godfrey Holden Pike, a Methodist writer, published Byeways of Two Cities, in 1873 and the Romance of the Streets in 1872
- James Greenwood, a Victorian journalist and social commentator, first published an article 'A Mission Among City Savages', the Daily Telegraph and subsequently in a collection entitled, In Strange Company in 1873. His commentary relates especially to the street vendors working around Whitecross Street, London. He also wrote, Toilers in London in 1883
- Charles Booth wrote, Life and Labour of the People in London a multi-volume book published in 1891. Volume 17 contains commentary on costermongers and their lifestyle.
- John Thomson and Adolphe Smith, collaborated in the production of a monthly magazine, Street Life in London, between 1876 and 1877. These were subsequently published as a pictorial essay in book form, also called Street Life in London in 1878.

== Legal standing ==
The costermonger's trade in London is subject to regulation by law, under the administration of the Commissioner of Police of the Metropolis. If the pitch is stationary, by-laws of local councils also apply. Legislation exists under clause six of the Metropolitan Streets Act 1867 (30 & 31 Vict. c. 134), which deals with obstruction by goods to pavements (sidewalks) and streets. There are various modern amendments, the first of which occurred mere months after the passing of the original Act.

== See also ==
- Arabber
- Cockney
- Huckster
- Merchant
- Peddler
- Retail
- Street food
- Street market
- Street photography

== Sources and further reading ==
- A Dictionary of Modern Slang, Cant and Vulgar Words, London, John Camden Hotten, London, Project Gutenberg edition. Online: 1860.https://www.gutenberg.org/files/47018/47018-h/47018-h.htm
- Bouchardon, E., Études Prises Dans le Bas Peuple ou les Cris de Paris, 1737 <Online: http://gallica.bnf.fr/ark:/12148/btv1b105087672>
- Greenwood, J., Toilers in London, (1883), Dodo Press, 2009
- Greenwood, J., In Strange Company, (1874)
- Hindley, C., A History of the Cries of London: Ancient and Modern, (1885), Project Gutenberg edition, 2011 <Online: https://www.gutenberg.org/files/37114/37114-h/37114-h.htm>
- Knight, C., Knight's Cyclopedia of London, C. Knight & Co, 1851 Online: <https://catalog.hathitrust.org/Record/000156820>
- Mayhew, H., London Labour and the London Poor, Volume 1, 1861 Digital editions: <http://dl.tufts.edu/catalog/tei/tufts:MS004.002.052.001.00001>; <https://archive.org/details/londonlabourand01mayhgoog>
