= Denzil =

Denzil may refer to:

== People ==
- Denzil Batchelor, British journalist and writer
- Denzil Best, American jazz percussionist
- Denzil Botus, Trinidadian pannist
- Denzil Angus Carty, American Episcopal priest
- Denzil Davies, British politician
- Denzil Dean Harber, British Trotskyist leader
- Denzil Dennis, Jamaican reggae singer
- Denzil Dolley, South African field hockey player
- Denzil Douglas, former Prime Minister of Saint Kitts and Nevis
- Denzil Dowell, police shooting victim
- Denzil Doyle, Canadian entrepreneur
- Denzil Fernando (1923-2010), Sri Lankan Sinhala lawyer and politician
- Denzil Forrester, Grenada artist
- Denzil Fortescue, 6th Earl Fortescue, British lieutenant colonel
- Denzil Foster, one half of the American R&B duo Foster & McElroy
- Denzil Franco, Indian footballer
- Denzil Freeth, British politician
- Denzil Hale, English footballer
- Denzil Haroun, Manchester United Football Club club director
- Denzil Holles, 1st Baron Holles, English politician
- Denzil Hoaseb, Namibian footballer
- Denzil Ibbetson, English administrator of British India
- Denzil Jones, Welsh rugby player
- Denzil Keelor, Indian Air Force marshal
- Denzil Kobbekaduwa, Sri Lankan general
- Denzil Lacey, Irish radio presenter and DJ
- Denzil Meuli, New Zealand editor
- Denzil Meyrick, Scottish novelist
- Denzil Minnan-Wong, Toronto city councilor
- Denzil Owen, West Indian cricketer
- Denzil Peiris (1917-1985), Sri Lankan Sinhala journalist
- Denzil Price Marshall Jr., United States District Judge
- Denzil Ralph Evans, English association footballer
- Denzil Romero, Venezuelan writer
- Denzil Sequeira, Botswana cricketer
- Denzil Smith, Indian actor and producer
- Denzil Smith (footballer), Trinidadian footballer
- Denzil Thompson, Guyana football team manager
- Denzil Webster, English cricketer
- Denzil Williams, Welsh rugby player

== Fictional characters ==
- Denzil Calburn, from Emmerdale
- Denzil Kelly, from Waterloo Road
- Denzil Tulser, from Only Fools and Horses

== Other uses ==
- Denzil (band), English rock band
- Denzil, Saskatchewan
- Denzil Quarrier, 1892 novel by George Gissing
- Denzil, Saskatchewan, Canada

== See also ==
- Denzel (disambiguation)
- Denzil Holles (disambiguation)
- Denzil Onslow (disambiguation)
