= Gissing =

Gissing is a surname. Notable people with the surname include:

- Alfred Gissing (1896–1975), English writer and headmaster
- Algernon Gissing (1860–1937), English writer
- George Gissing (1857–1903), English novelist
- Harry Gissing (1890–1963), American track and field athlete
- Jason Gissing (born 1970), British businessman

== See also ==
- Gissing, Norfolk, a village and civil parish in England
- Gissing v. Gissing, a case in English property law
