= 1903 in the United Kingdom =

Events from the year 1903 in the United Kingdom.

== Incumbents ==
- Monarch – Edward VII
- Prime Minister – Arthur Balfour (Coalition)

== Events ==
- 1 January – Edward VII is proclaimed Emperor of India.
- 19 January – first transatlantic radio broadcast between United States and Britain.
- 27 January – fire at Colney Hatch Lunatic Asylum kills 51.
- 12 February – Randall Davidson enthroned as Archbishop of Canterbury, a position he will hold until he retires 25 years later.
- 13 February – Venezuelan crisis. After agreeing to arbitration in Washington, Britain, Germany and Italy reach a settlement with Venezuela, resulting in the Washington Protocols. The naval blockade that began in December 1902 will be lifted, and Venezuela commits 30% of its customs duties to settling claims.
- 26–27 February – "Ulysses" Storm: A severe windstorm tracks across Ireland, moving on to cross the north of England and Scotland.
- 3 March – the Admiralty announces plans to build Rosyth Dockyard as a naval base on the Firth of Forth at Rosyth.
- 24 March & 3 May – Derby earthquakes.
- 1 April – Midwives Act 1902 comes into effect, regulating the profession of midwifery in England and Wales.
- 14 April – Aberdeen Football Club is established.
- 18 April – Bury F.C. beat Derby County by an all-time record 6 goals to nil to win the 1903 FA Cup Final.
- 23 April – Budget removes Corn Duty.
- 29 May – Bradford City Football Club is established.
- c. June – Osea Island off Maldon, Essex, is bought by Frederick Nicholas Charrington to provide an alcohol addiction treatment centre.
- 19 June – Caernarfon earthquake.
- 7 July – British take over the Fulani empire.
- August – 2nd Congress of the Russian Social Democratic Labour Party moves from Brussels to London.
- 14 August – first Poor Prisoners' Defence Act provides for limited legal aid in criminal cases with effect from 1904.
- 17 August – Gillingham in Kent is incorporated, establishing the Gillingham Borough Council.
- September – First Garden City Ltd formed to develop Letchworth.
- 9 September – Rock Sand completes the English Triple Crown by finishing first in the Epsom Derby, 2,000 Guineas and St Leger.
- 16 September – Joseph Chamberlain resigns as Colonial Secretary.
- 1 October – the University of Liverpool becomes independent of Victoria University.
- 10 October – foundation of the militant Women's Social and Political Union by Emmeline and Christabel Pankhurst in Manchester.
- 31 October – opening of Hampden Park football ground in Glasgow in Scotland.
- October:
  - Opening of Willow Tearooms, Sauchiehall Street, Glasgow, designed by Charles Rennie Mackintosh for Catherine Cranston.
  - The wettest month in the EWP series with 218.1 millimetres (8.59 in), beating November 1852 with 202.5 millimetres (7.97 in)
- 2 November – Daily Mirror launched as a newspaper for women, run by women.
- ? December – the remains of "Cheddar Man" are found within Gough's Cave in Cheddar Gorge, Britain's oldest complete human skeleton, dating to approximately 7150 BCE.
- 10 December – William Randal Cremer is awarded the Nobel Peace Prize.

=== Undated ===
- "Typhoo Tipps" tea first marketed.
- Montague Burton establishes a business retailing ready-made men's suits in Chesterfield, Derbyshire, origin of the Burton and Arcadia Group brands.
- Percy Furnivall carries out the first known case of cardiac surgery in Britain.

== Publications ==
- Edward Harold Begbie's novel Lost in Blunderland (under the pseudonym Caroline Lewis).
- Samuel Butler's semi-autobiographical novel The Way of All Flesh (posthumous).
- George Gissing's semi-autobiographical novel The Private Papers of Henry Ryecroft.
- John Morley's biography The Life of Gladstone, which sells more than 25,000 copies in its first year.

== Births ==
- 7 January – Alan Napier, actor (died 1988)
- 10 January – Barbara Hepworth, sculptor (died 1975)
- 18 January
  - Gladys Hooper, née Nash, pianist and supercentenarian (died 2016)
  - Kathleen Shaw, figure skater (died 1983)
- 22 February – Frank P. Ramsey, mathematician (died 1930)
- 4 March – Dorothy Mackaill, British-born American actress (died 1990)
- 10 March – Edward Bawden, artist and illustrator (died 1989)
- 24 March – Malcolm Muggeridge, journalist, author and media personality (died 1990)
- 31 March – H. J. Blackham, humanist and author (died 2009)
- 5 April – Hilda Margaret Bruce, zoologist (died 1974)
- 15 April – John Williams, actor (died 1983)
- 12 May
  - Faith Bennett, actress and WWII Air Transport Auxiliary pilot (died 1969)
  - Lennox Berkeley, composer (died 1989)
- 29 May – Bob Hope, British-born comedian (died 2003)
- 12 June – H. C. Casserley, railway photographer (died 1991)
- 19 June – Wally Hammond, cricketer (died 1965)
- 25 June – George Orwell, author (died 1950)
- 29 June – Alan Blumlein, electronics engineer (died 1942)
- 1 July – Amy Johnson, aviator (died 1941)
- 2 July – Alec Douglas-Home, Prime Minister (died 1995)
- 3 July – David Webster, Scottish-born arts administrator (died 1971)
- 4 July – Vernon Sewell, film director and screenwriter (died 2001)
- 7 July – Steven Runciman, historian (died 2000)
- 10 July – John Wyndham, English author (died 1969)
- 12 July – Judith Hare, Countess of Listowel, Hungarian-born writer and journalist (died 2003)
- 11 July – Rudolf Abel (alias of Vilyam "Willie" Genrikhovich Fisher), English-born spy for the Soviet Union (died 1971)
- 13 July – Kenneth Clark, art historian (died 1983)
- 26 July – Amy Gentry, rower (died 1976)
- 28 July – Ernst Wilhelm Bohle, English-born Nazi German statesman (died 1960)
- 7 August – Louis Leakey, paleoanthropologist, born in British East Africa (died 1972)
- 24 August – Graham Sutherland, artist (died 1980)
- 2 September – Fred Pratt Green, Methodist minister and hymn writer (died 2000)
- 7 September – Jock Wilson, soldier (died 2008)
- 8 September – Jane Arbor, writer (died 1994)
- 9 September – Edward Upward, author (died 2009)
- 28 October – Evelyn Waugh, writer (died 1966)
- 29 October – Vivian Ellis, composer and lyricist (died 1996)
- 31 October – Joan Robinson, economist (died 1983)
- 1 November – Max Adrian, Irish-born actor (died 1973)
- 5 November – Joan Barry, actress (died 1989)
- 8 November – Ronald Lockley, ornithologist and naturalist (died 2000)
- 11 November – Thomas Allibone, physicist (died 2003)
- 4 December – A. L. Rowse, historian (died 1997)
- 5 December – Cecil Frank Powell, physicist, Nobel Prize laureate (died 1969)
- 10 December – Mary Norton, children's author (died 1992)
- 13 December – John Piper, artist (died 1992)
- unknown date – John Illingworth, yachtsman, yacht designer and naval officer (died 1980)

== Deaths ==
- 17 January – Quintin Hogg, philanthropist (born 1845)
- 1 February – Sir George Stokes, 1st Baronet, mathematician and physicist (born 1819)
- 7 February – James Glaisher, meteorologist and aeronaut (born 1809)
- 4 March – Joseph Henry Shorthouse, novelist (born 1834)
- 13 March – George Granville Bradley, vicar and scholar (born 1821)
- 10 April – Enderby Jackson, pioneer of the British brass band (born 1827)
- 19 June – Herbert Vaughan, Catholic cardinal and archbishop (born 1832)
- 11 July – W. E. Henley, poet, critic, and editor (born 1849)
- 5 August – Phil May, artist (born 1864)
- 22 August – Robert Cecil, Marquess of Salisbury, Prime Minister of the United Kingdom (born 1830)
- 18 September – Alexander Bain, philosopher (born 1818)
- 8 December – Herbert Spencer, philosopher (born 1820)
- 28 December – George Gissing, novelist (born 1857)

== See also ==
- List of British films before 1920
