= Gissing Family =

Noted British family

The Gissing family of Great Britain included several noted writers, Olympic competitors, and teachers.

== George Gissing ==
George Robert Gissing (1857–1903) was an English novelist, some of whose work has appeared in many editions, including The Nether World (1889), New Grub Street (1891) and The Odd Women (1893).

== Algernon Gissing ==
Algernon Fred Gissing (1860–1937) was an English novelist and the younger brother of George Robert Gissing.

== Alfred Charles Gissing ==
Alfred Charles Gissing (20 January 1896 (Epsom, Surrey) – 27 November 1975 (Valais, Switzerland), was an English writer and headmaster, the youngest son of George. After the early death of their father on 28 December 1903, Walter Leonard (born at Exeter on 10 December 1891) and Alfred Charles, benefited from a small government pension. The following report was published in The Times newspaper for 24 June 1904:

"A pension of £74 a year has been granted to Mr. Walter Gissing and Mr. Alfred Gissing during the minority of either and in recognition of the literary merits of their late father, Mr. George Gissing and of their straitened circumstances."

At the time, Walter was a boarder at school in Norfolk, and Alfred had moved in 1902 to live with foster parents, a Mr and Mrs Smith who were farmers at Treverva Farm, Mabe, near Falmouth, Cornwall. Alfred lived with them until he left school. Like his brother Walter, Alfred went as a boarder to Gresham's School, Holt. He was there between 1910 and 1914, becoming a House Prefect.

=== Military service ===
While at Gresham's School, Alfred had been in the junior division of the Officers' Training Corps from January 1910 to August 1914, when, with war apparent, he volunteered to join the British Army. As a member of the British Red Cross Society & Order of St John, he first served in France as Orderly with the Friends Ambulance Unit, Dunkirk, from 2 October 1915 until early December 1915.

On 10 December 1915, he filed an "application for appointment to a temporary commission in the regular army for the period of the war". As he was under 21 years of age, the application had to be signed by his guardian, Clara Collet, who took care of him after his father's death. Alfred was commissioned as a second lieutenant in the Royal Garrison Artillery on 16 December 1915, and promoted to lieutenant on 7 July 1917. He was in India when the news reached him of his brother Walter's death at Gommecourt during the Battle of the Somme on 1 July 1916.

After the end of the war, Alfred Gissing remained in the army, serving in Iraq and then working for the Inter-Allied Press Censorship Committee in Constantinople between May 1919 and February 1920. He was demobilised on 5 March 1919 and resigned his commission in the Special Reserve on 28 April 1920, leaving the service with the rank of lieutenant.

In the 1939 Register he described himself as a writer & Air Raid Warden (A.R.P.), living with his wife in Croft Cottage, Barbon, South Westmorland R.D., Westmorland. Despite his military experience and while he was still in his early forties at the beginning of the Second World War, Alfred Gissing did not seem to have joined the Army or the Home Guard and nothing is known of his activities during that time.

=== Writer ===
At about the time he left the army, Alfred Gissing assumed his father's posthumous interests from Algernon Gissing, and he went to live at Fernleigh, St Mark's Avenue, Leeds, Yorkshire, which had been Margaret and Ellen Gissing's home. He began to develop a collected edition of his father's works and to correspond with publishers and collectors as literary executor.

From 1924 until 1927, he lived in Richmond, Surrey. He wrote a preface for A Victim of Circumstances by George Gissing (Constable and Dutton, 1927), a collection of his father's short stories, and he edited a compendium of his father's work, Selections Autobiographical and Imaginative from the Works of George Gissing (Jonathan Cape, 1929).

Alfred Gissing sold a number of his father's literary papers, often not using his own name in doing so. The critic Bouwe Postmus speculates that he felt guilty about these sales. In his own right, Alfred Gissing wrote biographies. He wrote a 600-page unpublished biography of his father and several other shorter accounts, also unpublished.

=== Personal life ===
On 26 July 1938, he married Frances Muriel Smith, a 32-year-old widow whose maiden name was Braham, in Broadway, Gloucestershire. They had three children, Michael, Charles William (who died in infancy), and Jane—who became a British Olympic skier. After the Second World War, Alfred settled at Salvan in the Swiss canton of Valais, an area well known to George Gissing, where Alfred founded and ran an English school for children displaced by the war, subsidised by UNESCO. The Alfred Gissing family moved to Les Marécottes, near Salvan, where they purchased a hotel in 1951, and remained there for the rest of his life. Alfred died and was buried at Salvan in 1975.

=== Selected publications ===
- Letters to members of his family by George Gissing, collected and arranged by Algernon and Ellen Gissing, with a preface by his son, Ellen Gissing, Alfred C. Gissing & Algernon Gissing
- A Victim of Circumstances and other stories by George Gissing, ed. Alfred C Gissing (Constable, London, 1927, and Houghton Mifflin Company, New York, 1927)
- Selections autobiographical and imaginative from the works of George Gissing ed. Alfred C. Gissing, with an introduction by Virginia Woolf (Cape, London, 1929, and J. Cape & H. Smith, New York, 1929)
- William Holman Hunt, a biography by Alfred Charles Gissing (Duckworth, London, 1936)
- Stories and Sketches by George Gissing, with preface by Alfred C. Gissing (London, Michael Joseph, 1938)

Unpublished

- George Gissing, a biography, by Alfred C. Gissing

== Jane Eleanor Margaret Gissing ==
Alfred Gissing's daughter, Jane Eleanor Margaret Gissing (married: Pétremand-Besancenet) (born 9 June 1943 in Leeds, UK), is a British Olympic level skier who took part in the World Championships in 1962 in Chamonix (France) and who was also part of the British team at the 1964 Winter Olympics, held in Innsbruck, Austria. She is the granddaughter of Victorian novelist George Gissing.

== Next generations ==
Estelle Eleanor Pétremand-Koszali (born on 8 February 1970), Jane's daughter, was an Alpine skier who was a member of the Swiss Ski Team and competed at the World Cup level. She is married to Pierre Koszali, a Hungarian Alpine skier who took part in the Olympics in 1992 in Albertville as well as a Swiss military Commandant de company, France, and competed in two World Championships. Her son Zac Jonathan Koszali, born on 19 May 2005, is also an Alpine skier athlete in Switzerland and is a Swiss military officer.Her other son Tyler Alexandre Koszali (born on the 30 of Novembre 2009), he is also an Alpine skier athlete and his little sister Sienna Eleanor Koszali ( born on the 13 of March 2012), who is an Alpine skier athlete as well.
