= Denkel =

Denkel is a Turkish surname. Notable people with the surname include:

- Arda Denkel (1949–2000), Turkish philosopher
- Gökçen Denkel (born 1985), Turkish volleyball player

== See also ==
- Denzel (disambiguation)
