= The Paying Guest =

1895 novella by George Gissing

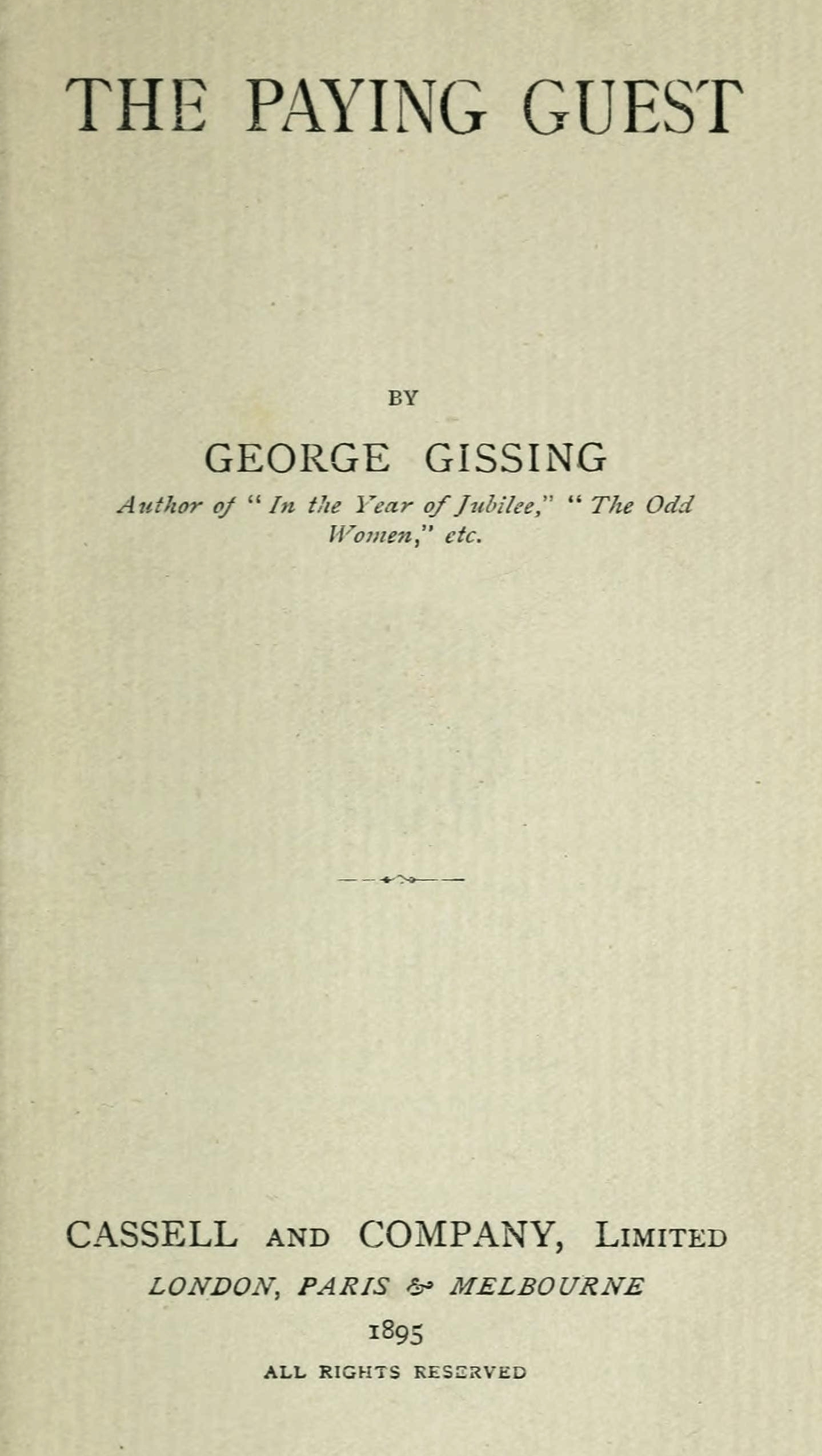
- First edition title page
- Author: George Gissing
- Language: English
- Publisher: Cassell
- Publication date: 1895
- Publication place: United Kingdom
- Pages: 159

The Paying Guest is a satirical novella by George Gissing, first published in 1895 by Cassell, as part of their Pocket Library series. It recounts the experiences of the Mumfords, a middle-class family who invite a "paying guest" into their home to supplement their income. Written in an unusually comic tone compared with Gissing's earlier works, The Paying Guest was generally received well by critics. Gissing himself, however, was not satisfied with the work.

== Plot ==
Clarence and Emmeline Mumford are a middle-class couple, living in suburban Sutton on the outskirts of London with their two-year-old daughter. Reading the newspaper, they become aware of a young woman seeking a place as a "paying guest", or lodger. To supplement their income they respond to the advertisement and meet the prospective tenant, named Louise Derrick, who is in need of a place to live due to disagreements with her immediate family. Louise, who is poorly educated and bad-tempered, is being romantically pursued by two men: Mr Bowling, who is courting Louise's stepsister Cecily, and Tom Cobb.

The Mumfords do not get on well with their "paying guest", and attempt to persuade her to leave. This does not happen, and a series of events further disrupts the Mumfords' lives, including a private meeting between Louise and Clarence Mumford, which makes Clarence's wife jealous. Louise briefly and half heartedly seems to encourage Bowling's wooing of her, now that his courtship of Cecily is over, but Cobb makes a surprise trip to the Mumfords' home to pursue Louise. Louise, tripping on a chair Cobb had knocked over during the confrontation, accidentally starts a fire in the drawing room of the property, injuring Louise, who is then confined to bed for several weeks.

Eventually, Louise's time as the Mumfords' "paying guest" comes to an end, and she marries Cobb.

== Background and publication ==
Gissing was commissioned to write The Paying Guest by Cassell, as part of their Pocket Library series. Gissing wrote the manuscript in the first half of July 1895. It was one of three one-volume works by Gissing published in 1895, the other two being Eve's Ransom and Sleeping Fires; the latter of these was published in Unwin's Autonym Library series.

Gissing was not satisfied with The Paying Guest, describing it in a private letter as "a poor little book" and a "frothy trifle". His experience persuaded him, according to his diary, to "have no more to do with these series of little books".

== Reception ==
Despite Gissing's reservations, The Paying Guest sold well, and was generally met with a very positive reception by critics. Writing in the Saturday Review, H. G. Wells described the work as "Gissing at his best", suggesting that Gissing had succeeded in offering "an enhanced impression of reality", although this meant that "the personality of the author" was suppressed. A reviewer in the Daily News described the work as exemplifying "many of his [Gissing's] finest qualities", being "so finely observed, so admirably well executed". The New York Times praised it as "very entertaining and profitable reading", particularly noting in this regard the interaction between Louise and the Mumfords. Percy Addleshaw was impressed by the humour, realism and emotive power of the work, describing it as "a subtly study of human nature, an excellent bit of writing and composition". He concluded that, in his opinion, "even Mr Gissing will find it hard to equal The Paying Guest." In contrast, the New York Book Buyer stated: "this sort of tale seems to us about as worthy as an intaglio carving in putty".
