= Denzel =

Denzel, when used as a male name, ultimately derives from the Cornish language and means "from the high stronghold" or "fertile ground."

The manor dates to at least the early 1500s and was described in volume 3 of Magna Britannia (1814) as being the home of an "ancient family of that name".

== Notable individuals with the name include ==
- Denzel Akyeampong (born 2004), English footballer
- Denzel Bentley (born 1995), English boxer
- Denzel Boston (born 2003), American football player
- Denzel Bowles (born 1989), American basketball player
- Denzel Budde (born 1997), Dutch footballer
- Denzel Burke (born 2002), American football player
- Denzel Clarke (born 2000), Canadian baseball player
- Denzel Comenentia (born 1995), Dutch athlete
- Denzel Curry (born 1995), American rapper
- Denzel Daxon (born 1999), Bahamian American football player
- Denzel De Roeve (born 2004), Belgian footballer
- Denzel Devall (born 1994), American football player
- Denzel Dumfries (born 1996), Dutch footballer
- Denzelle Good (born 1991), American football player
- Denzel Hall (born 2001), Jamaican footballer
- Denzel Jubitana (born 1999), Belgian footballer
- Denzel Livingston (born 1993), American basketball player
- Denzel Mahoney (born 1998), American basketball player
- Denzel Mims (born 1997), American football player
- Denzel Nkemdiche (born 1993), American football player
- Denzel Nogueira Damasceno (born 2003), Brazilian footballer
- Denzel Perryman (born 1992), American football player
- Denzel Prempeh (born 1984), Ghanaian musician
- Denzel Radford (born 1994), Canadian football player
- Denzel Ramirez (born 1983), Trinidadian runner
- Denzel Rice (born 1993), American football player
- Denzel Slager (born 1993), Dutch footballer
- Denzel Valentine (born 1993), American basketball player
- Denzel Ward (born 1997), American football player
- Denzel Washington (born 1954), American actor
- Denzel Whitaker (born 1990), American actor

== Surname ==
- John Denzel (??–1535), English landowner
- Peter Denzel (born 1939), Austrian sailor
- Yomi Denzel (born 1996), Swiss-Nigerian entrepreneur

== Fictional characters ==
- Mr. Denzel Crocker, a character in The Fairly OddParents

== See also ==
- Danzel (born 1976), Belgian dance musician
- Denzil (disambiguation)
