= Workers in the Dawn =

1880 novel by George Gissing

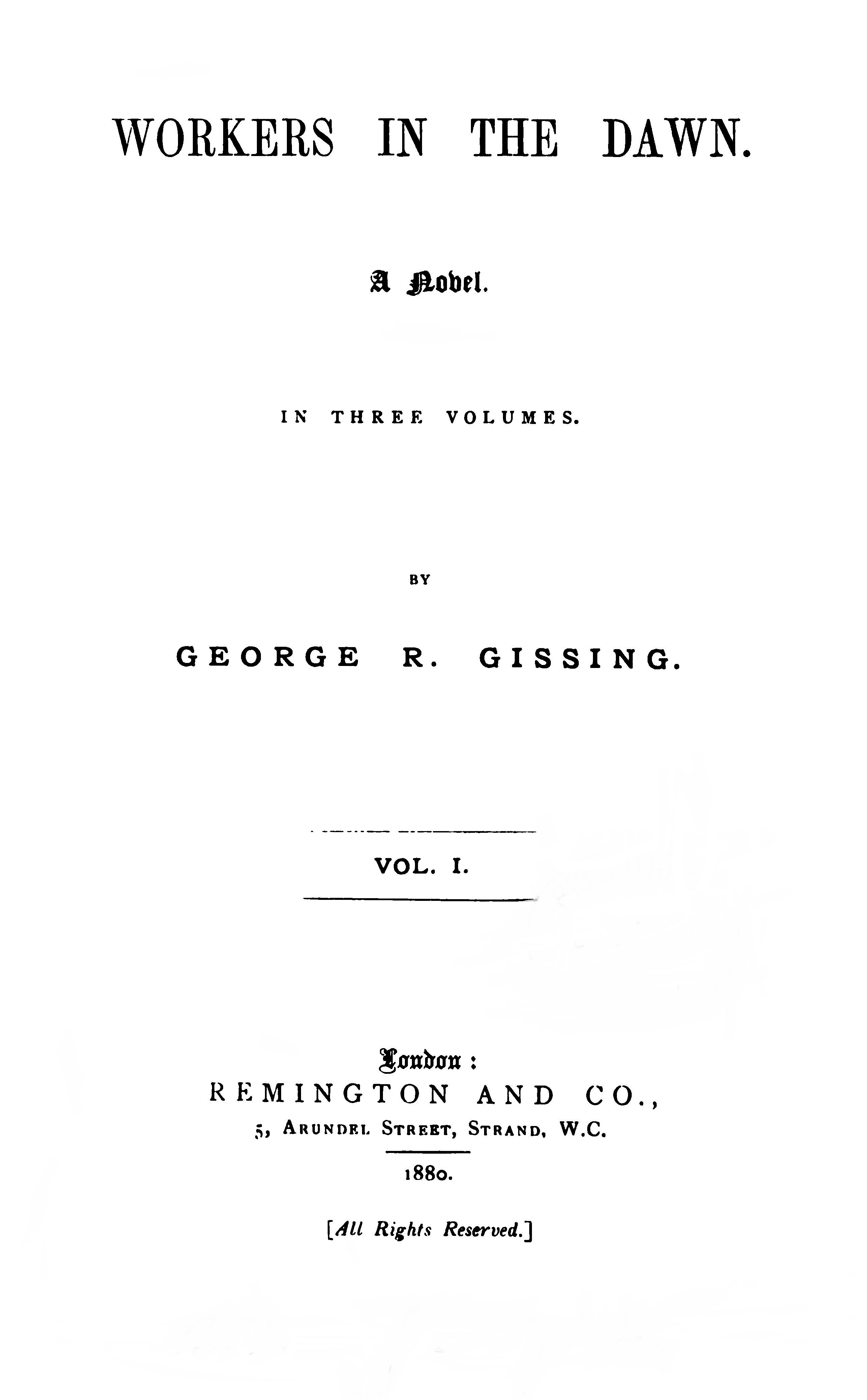
- First edition title page
- Author: George Gissing
- Language: English
- Publisher: Remington
- Publication date: 1880
- Publication place: United Kingdom

Workers in the Dawn is a novel by George Gissing, which was originally published in three volumes in 1880. It was the first of Gissing's published novels, although he had been working on another prior to this. The work focuses on the unhappy marriage of Arthur Golding, a rising artist from a poor background, and Carrie Mitchell, a prostitute. This plot was partly based on Gissing's negative experiences of marriage to his first wife. It also was designed to serve the function of political polemic, highlighting social issues that Gissing felt strongly about. Reviews of the novel generally recognised some potential in the author, but were critical of Workers in the Dawn. After reading the first known published review in the Athenaeum, Gissing was driven to describe critics as "unprincipled vagabonds".

== Plot ==
Arthur Golding grows up in poverty in London, and is orphaned at the age of eight. With the help of others, he succeeds in leaving this life behind, gains an education and embarks on a career as an artist. As a child he had lived briefly with Helen Norman and her father. Arthur later meets a prostitute named Carrie Mitchell and marries her. This marriage is an unhappy one, with Carrie and Arthur eventually separating due to her drunkenness and unsavoury associations.

After inheriting some money from Helen Norman's father, Arthur tells Helen that he loves her and she tells him that she has always loved him. Very soon afterwards, Helen finds out about Arthur's marriage to Carrie. Arthur is driven to commit suicide by jumping over Niagara Falls.

== Background and publication ==
Although Workers in the Dawn is the first of Gissing's published novels, it was not his first attempt at writing one. He had worked on another novel previously, but this unknown work was not accepted by any publishers, and has not survived. The writing of Workers in the Dawn was completed in about a year, and is the longest of Gissing's novels, with over 280,000 words across three volumes. The completion of the work was largely the result of encouragement and support from his friend Eduard Bertz. Writing to a friend in Germany, Bertz described himself as "in a way...the begetter of the book".

The novel is partly based on Gissing's own experiences of an unhappy marriage, to his first wife Marianne Helen Harrison. As well as this semi-autobiographical element, Gissing intended the book to have a social message. In a letter to his brother Algernon after publication, Gissing described the work as an "attack upon certain features of our present religious and social life which to me appear highly condemnable", particularly the "criminal negligence of governments". As an author, he saw himself as "a mouthpiece of the Radical party", concluding that "It is not a book for women and children, but for thinking and struggling men."

The original working title of the novel was Far Far Away, in reference to a song that appears in the novel, but the title was changed to Workers in the Dawn before publication. Gissing explained in a letter to Algernon that he had chosen this latter title because the "principal characters are earnest young people striving for improvement in, as it were, the dawn of a new phase of our civilization".

Gissing first offered it to a publisher in November 1879, but he faced rejection from a number of publishing firms, including Smith and Elder, Chatto and Windus and C. Kegan Paul. Eventually, he decided to publish a run of 277 copies of the novel at his own expense, through Remington and Company. This project cost him £125, with the contract demanding payment of £50 upfront, £40 after the printing of the first two volumes and £35 after the publication of the third. Under the agreement of Remington, two-thirds of any profit would go to the author. In the end, Gissing's income from Remington was sixteen shillings.

Later, when three-volume novels were less fashionable, Gissing worked on shorter revisions of his works, including Workers in the Dawn. He outlined changes in his own copy of the novel, but this revision was not completed.

== Reception ==
Contemporary reviews generally acknowledged that there were positive aspects of the novel, but on the whole were critical of it. The first known review to appear was an anonymous piece in the Athenaeum. The reviewer considered Gissing to have "considerable readiness and fluency of style" and also praised the author for his graphically realistic depiction of the poor. However, he accused Gissing of making a mistake common among "polemical novelists", of taking away from the novel's seriousness by making the negative characterisations of the novel "so very grotesque". The reviewer also commented that Gissing was "not quite a master of...the Queen's English". In The Academy, George Saintsbury was also unconvinced by the characterisations of the "wicked" upper classes, but he remarked positively on Gissing's sincerity, imagination and adventurousness.

The Graphic was critical of many aspects of the work, with the reviewer stating that he finished reading it with a feeling of "perplexity" and "weariness". He further stated that "the book is without plot", showing "little evidence of literary skill". He suggested that the time and effort put into writing it "might well have been diverted to another channel". The Examiner suggested that its shortcomings meant that it would have been better if the novel had never been published, as "it is so very suggestive of what he might have done, and has not done; of what he might have avoided, and has not avoided".

The publication of the review in the Athenaeum prompted Gissing, in a letter to Algernon, to describe critics as "unprincipled vagabonds". He criticised this particular reviewer for not understanding the "spirit of [the] book" and for judging it as a "mere polemical pamphlet, and not a work of art". However, he was flattered that his novel had received such a long critique in the magazine and concluded that overall it was "an attractive review".
