= A Life's Morning =

1888 novel by George Gissing

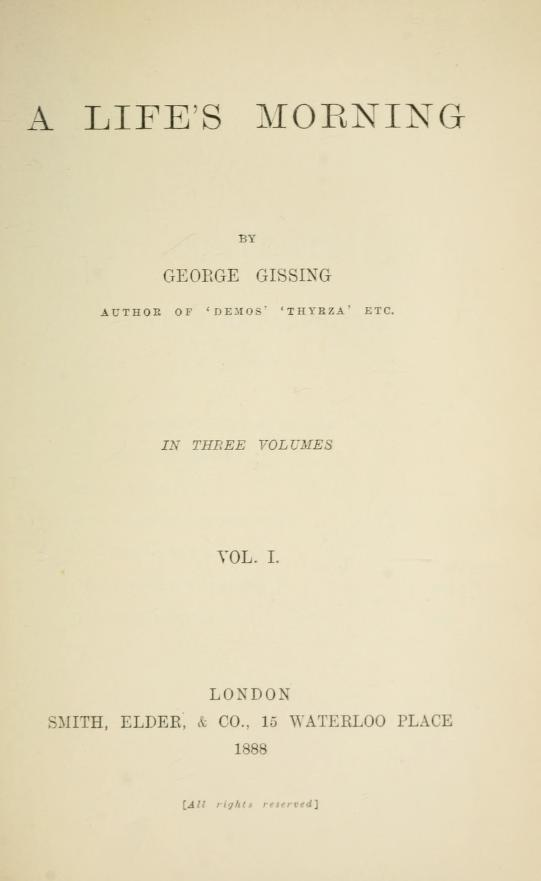
- Title page of the first edition
- Author: George Gissing
- Language: English
- Publisher: Smith, Elder & Co.
- Publication date: 1888
- Publication place: England

A Life's Morning is a novel by English author George Gissing. Although written in the space of three months during 1886 it was first published, in serial form, beginning January 1888, in Cornhill Magazine before being released by Smith, Elder & Co. as a novel.

== Plot ==
Originally entitled Emily, it tells the story of a poor, yet cultivated, young woman, Emily Hood, from a small town in the north of England. While serving as a governess to a wealthy country family, she becomes enamored of her employer's son, Wilfrid Athel, and the two are engaged. However, during a visit to her parents' home, she is confronted by her father's employer, Dagworthy, who threatens to expose her father as a thief unless Emily marries him. The situation is resolved when Hood Sr. commits suicide to spare his family the shame of his deeds as he had, indeed, 'stolen' ten pounds from his employer.

Emily rejects Wilfrid, partly out of sympathy for her father, but they meet again, many years later, and are married.
