= Will Warburton =

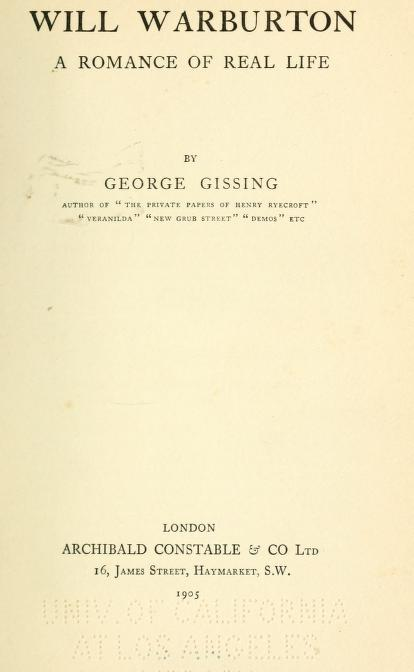
- Title page of the first edition
- Author: George Gissing
- Language: English
- Genre: Novel
- Publisher: Archibald Constable & Co.
- Publication date: 1905
- Publication place: England
- Pages: 333

Will Warburton: A Romance of Real Life was George Gissing's last novel. It was published in 1905, two years after Gissing's death.

== Plot summary ==
Will Warburton is a young gentleman of means, a man of commerce, who, losing everything in speculation, is forced into the life of a grocer, a thing he finds, at first, enormously tragic.

Will keeps his fate secret from his friends and his family and lives a life of humiliation and privation. It is only when the woman with whom he is falling in love discovers he is a grocer, and throws him over, that Will realizes that there is no shame in being a grocer.
