= In the Year of Jubilee =

1894 novel by George Gissing

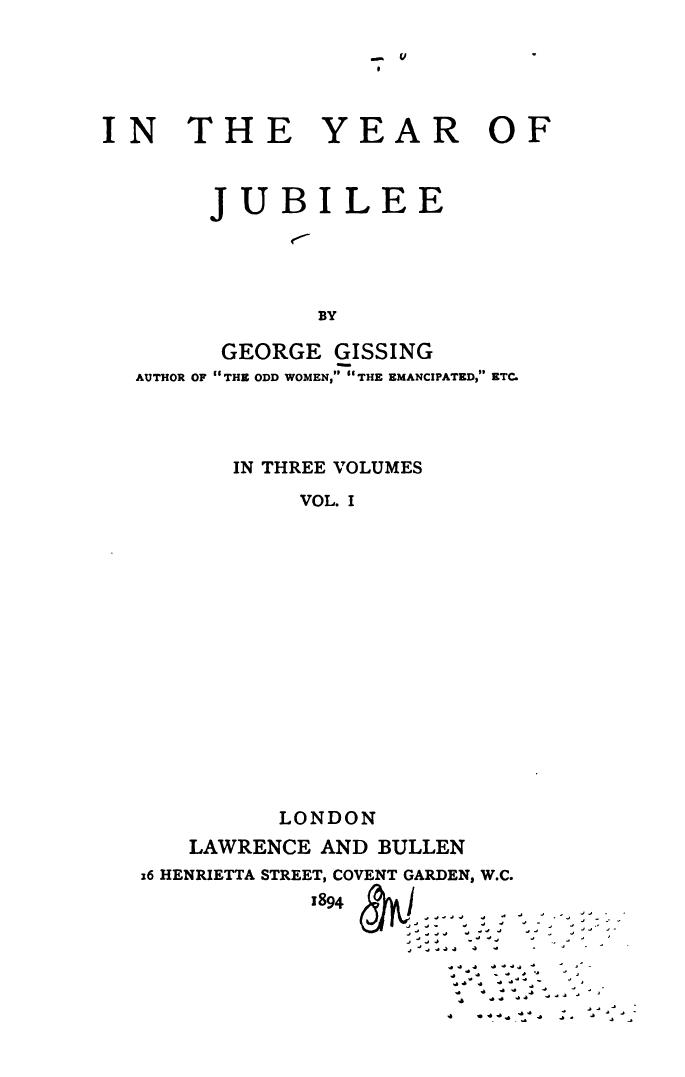
- Title page of the first edition
- Author: George Gissing
- Language: English
- Genre: Novel
- Publisher: Lawrence & Bullen
- Publication date: 1894
- Publication place: England

In the Year of Jubilee is the thirteenth novel by English author George Gissing. First published in 1894.

In the summer of 1893 Gissing returned to London after living for two years in Exeter, and took lodgings with his second wife at 76 Burton Road, Brixton: "he realised that in South London there was a new territory open to a novelist’s exploitation. From Burton Road he went for long walks through nearby Camberwell, soaking up impressions of the way of life he saw emerging there." This led him to writing In the Year of Jubilee, the story of "the romantic and sexual initiation of a suburban heroine, Nancy Lord." Gissing originally called his novel “Miss Lord of Camberwell”.

The title refers to the Golden Jubilee of Queen Victoria in 1887.
