= Born in Exile =

1892 novel by George Gissing

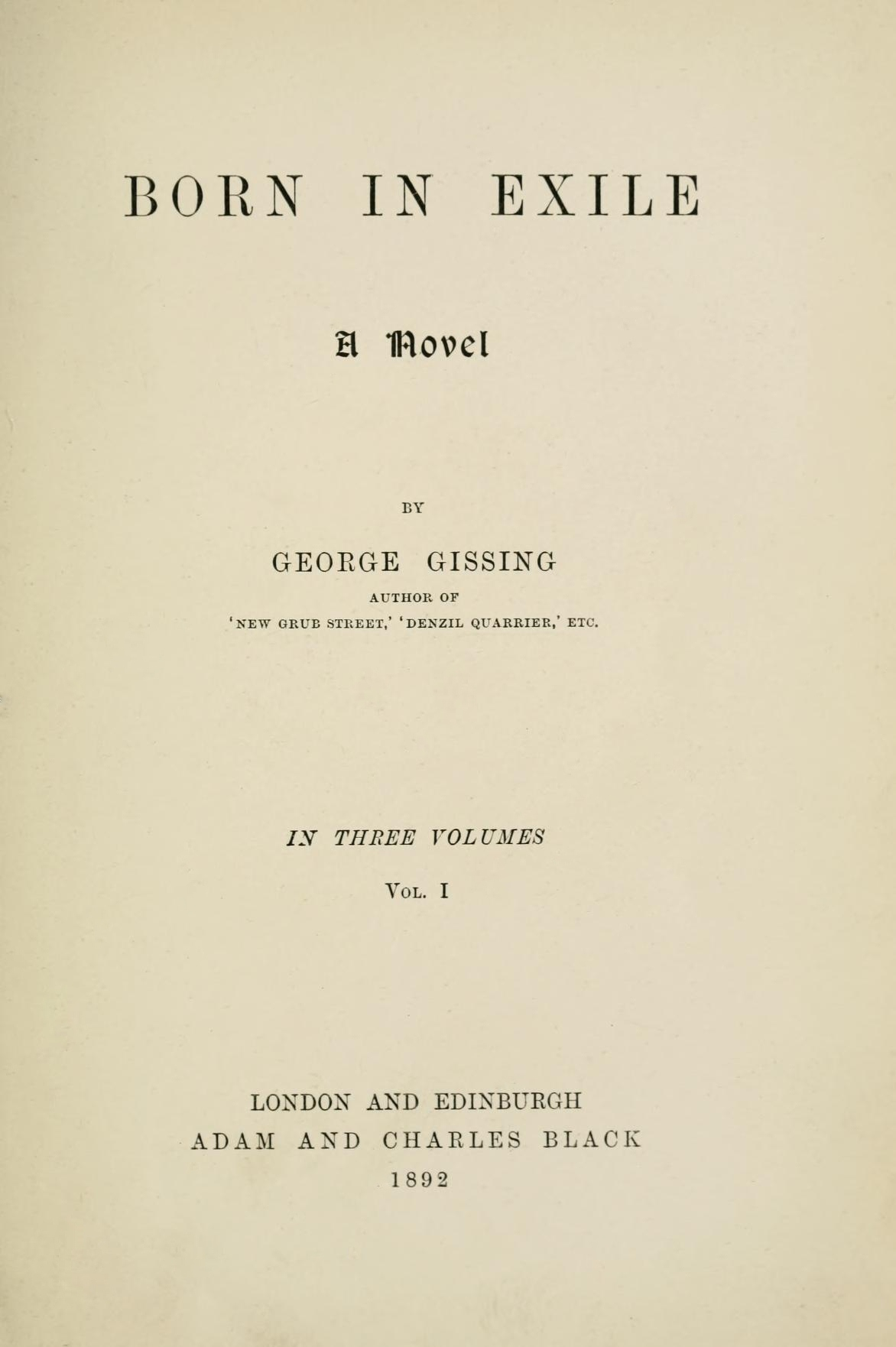
- Title page of the first edition.
- Author: George Gissing
- Language: English
- Publisher: A & C Black
- Publication date: 1892
- Publication place: England

Born in Exile is a novel by George Gissing first published in 1892. It deals with the themes of class, religion, love and marriage. The premise of the novel is drawn from Gissing's own early life — an intellectually superior man born into a socially inferior milieu, though the story arc diverges significantly from the actuality.

== Plot summary ==
The main protagonist, Godwin Peak, is a star student at Whitelaw College, which he won a scholarship to attend. He wins many academic prizes and his future seems promising. Then his Cockney uncle arrives intending to open an eating-house adjacent to the college. Godwin is mortified of being associated with 'trade' and leaves the college rather than face the scorn he expects to receive from his upper-class fellow students. This is indicative of his social aspirations (upwards) and snobbery (downwards).

He moves to London where he abhors the social mores of the lower orders and pines to be accepted into high society where he believes his intellect should place him. He sees writing as a possible entry and pens a fiercely critical article on the Church of England and its attitude to Darwinism. It is published anonymously but not before word of its true authorship has spread within his small circle of friends. These include Christian Moxey, who has an idealised romantic fixation on a married woman (ultimately found to be unrequited), Moxey's sister Marcella has a likewise unrequited crush on Godwin Peak, and Malkin-a flighty Bohemian who has an idea of training an adolescent girl to be a wife worthy of his radical views, and who has formed a relationship with Mrs. Jacox and her daughters to further this plan (ultimately successful).

After submitting the article Peak goes on holiday to the West Country stopping of in Exeter where he encounters the Warricombe family (minor gentry) whose son Buckland he was at Whitelaw with (Peak once visited the family as a child and was smitten by their daughter Sidwell). He trails the family around Exeter until he has an 'accidental' encounter with Buckland and gets invited to their house. He meets Sidwell, now a beautiful and devoutly religious woman, and in a hypocritical volte face Peak declares himself a Christian and whats more his intent to take Holy Orders. This plan would give him two things he desires: an upper class wife and entry into a socially higher class through his vocation. He stays in Exeter to execute his plan and proximity to the Warricombes, especially Sidwell and her father, seems to be getting him closer to his goals.

However Buckland Warricombe distrusts him, seeing him as a social upstart, and seeks out Peak's London friends to ascertain his motives. He meets with the Moxeys and while there Malkin arrives, whose mouth runs away with him, exposing Peak's authorship of the article thus revealing Peak as a fraud and hypocrite. Marcella does not stop Malkin despite knowing the consequences for Peak, as it suits her ends to hamper Peak and Sidwell's relationship. Ironically Marcella is shown to be a better mate for Peak but he is more interested in Sidwell's beauty and social position.

Buckland exposes Peak as a hypocrite and possible fraudster to Sidwell and her father (who liked Peak believing him to be sympathetic to his anti-evolutionary Anglicanism). However Sidwell has fallen in love with Peak and forgives him but Peak feels he cannot stay in Exeter and be shamed by the revelation of his hypocrisy, reminiscent of his leaving college rather than be associated with tradespeople.

They part but keep up a cool, sporadic correspondence for some years. Then Marcella Moxey is killed while trying to prevent a horse being beaten and leaves her considerable wealth to Peak. He reluctantly accepts it (she had previously offered him money but he refused it) and now an independent man of means he proposes marriage to Sidwell. She almost accepts him but out of love and loyalty to her family, and father in particular, she turns him down. Denied his aspiration to marry into society Peak goes on a tour of Europe where he contracts Malaria and dies alone in a Viennese boarding-house. Thus Peak was born, lived and died in Exile.
