= The Whirlpool (Gissing novel) =

1897 novel by George Gissing

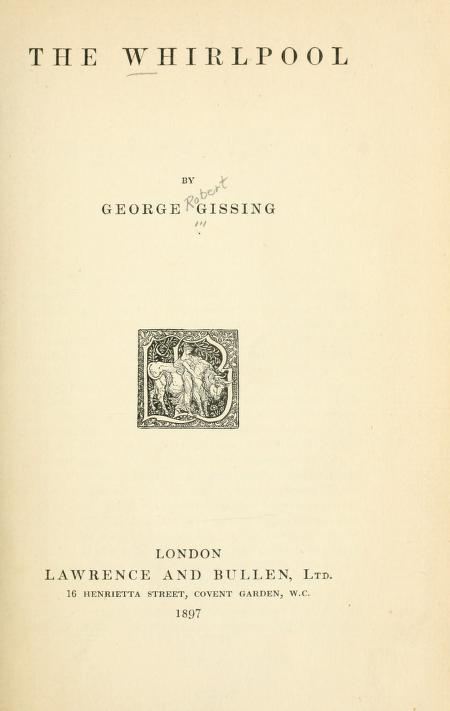
- Title page of the first edition.
- Author: George Gissing
- Language: English
- Publisher: Lawrence and Bullen
- Publication date: 1897
- Publication place: England
- Pages: 453

The Whirlpool is a novel by English author George Gissing, first published in 1897.
