= Yomi Denzel =

Swiss entrepreneur (1996-)

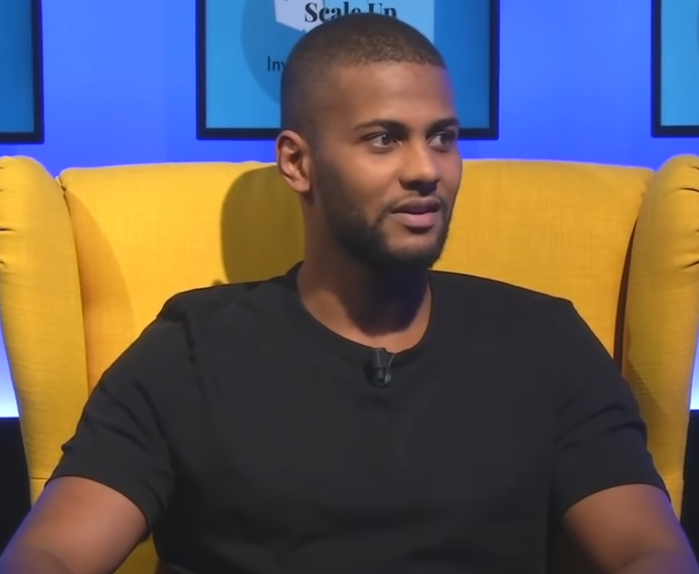
- Yomi Denzel in December 2021.
- Born: Ayomidé Nicolas Olaniyi; 1 August 1996 (age 30); Lausanne, Switzerland
- Education: HEC Lausanne; Harvard University
- Occupation: Entrepreneur
- Years active: 2017–present
- Partners: Vanessa Mukendi (2016–2020); Anaelle Charvier (2020–2022; 2023–2025)
- Relatives: Kaanu Olaniyi (brother)

YouTube information
- Channel: Yomi Denzel
- Genre: Online business
- Subscribers: 1.51 million
- Views: 328 million
- Last updated: September 6, 2026
- Website: www.yomidenzel.com

Yomi Denzel (born 1 August 1996) is a Swiss entrepreneur and YouTuber in e-commerce.

He started with e-commerce and online training businesses and increased his notoriety by running contests on Instagram designed to win prestigious prizes.

== Early life, education and beginnings ==
Yomi Denzel Olaniyi was born in Lausanne, Switzerland, into a family of modest means. His father was an undocumented immigrant from Nigeria; his mother, who had no formal education, worked in human resources in a large company. He is the brother of former basketball player Kaanu Olaniyi. During his teenage years, Yomi Denzel was an amateur football player.

In 2010, at the age of 14, he launched his YouTube channel with gaming content.

He reached the rank of sergeant in the Swiss Armed Forces. He studied at HEC Lausanne and completed a semester at Harvard University.

== Career ==
In 2017, at the age of 21 and during his studies at HEC Lausanne, he created an online marketing agency.

In 2019, 1000 people came for one of its conference in Geneva, and he gathered a community of 190,000 followers on YouTube. At the age of 22, he is considered as "the main figure in e-commerce 4.0 in French-speaking world" (i.e. dropshiping) by the Swiss journal Le Temps. Yomi Denzel pretend became millionaire only with dorpshipping. But According French journal Numerama, the sell "dropshipping training". At 1 000 CHF (2019) or 1 500€ (2021) for the training, he can expect to make a lot of profit.

In September 2020, he ran a contest on Instagram, with prestigious prizes. Several celebrities such as the French footballer Dimitri Payet shared the publication and more than a million people answered on the Instagram publication. one year after, he launched a similar competition with bigger prizes. Participant could earn a Tesla car or a Chanel bag by following its account and commenting its post. Yomi Denzel buy advertised in Paris Métro and on the French TV channel M6 and TF1. According Numerama, the main objective of this lottery is a "cheap advertised" to grow its number of followers and showcase its training programs By the end of 2021, Yomi Denzel acquired 486,000 followers on YouTube.

In 2022, he ran the online training company Mindeo and holds 550,000 followers on YouTube.

== Awards and nominations ==
Organization	Year	Category	Nominated work	Result	Ref.
Bilan	2022	Entrepreneurs in French-speaking Switzerland under the age of 40	Himself	Included	

== Philanthropy ==
In 2022, he created a foundation providing free education for the development of Nigerian Youths. The foundation offers 6 months of practical training on Python Programming, Data Analytics, Machine learning and Blockchain development in Lagos. The first promotion graduated in April 2024.

== Controversies ==
Yomi Denzel has attracted criticism because of his apparent closeness to certain controversial figures. In a video released on 2 June 2023 on his YouTube channel, the influencer describes the masculinist Andrew Tate as an “inspiring” person and speaks of the admiration he feels for Tate. Denzel particularly admires Tate’s “power of persuasion and influence”. This message is repeated across Yomi Denzel’s various social media platforms, including TikTok, Instagram and even LinkedIn. Elon Musk is also a personality who has attracted the interest of Yomi Denzel. The latter admires his "courage" and wishes to collaborate with the head of Tesla.

Z-Event 2026

The Z-Event is a French charity event bringing together several internet personalities from diverse backgrounds. Yomi Denzel was not selected as an "official streamer", but he was invited by the content creator Anyme.

Yomi Denzel presence at the event sparked controversy, with several participants criticizing his masculinist and far-right views, which they considered incompatible with the values promoted by the Z-event.

Yomi Denzel defended himself by claiming that he had been confused with Alex Hitchens, who is known for his masculinist views, because they are both black. Following this, several Z-Event participants confirmed that there had been no confusion and that Yomi Denzel was indeed the person they had accused of masculinism. Melissa Amneris compiled several interviews with Yomi Denzel to demonstrate that there had been no confusion. Anyme himself regrets inviting Yomi Denzel, explaining that he had not been fully aware of his political views or of the publicity the invitation would give him. He denies any links to the far right.
