= The Town Traveller =

1898 novel by George Gissing

- Title page for The Town Traveller (1898)
- Author: George Gissing
- Language: English
- Genre: Fiction
- Published: 1898
- Publisher: London Methuen
- Publication place: UK
- Pages: 372

The Town Traveller is an 1898 novel by George Gissing. Known more for works of social realism, this novel marked a departure from that style from Gissing, and incidentally was his biggest commercial success.
