= Demos (novel) =

1886 novel by George Gissing

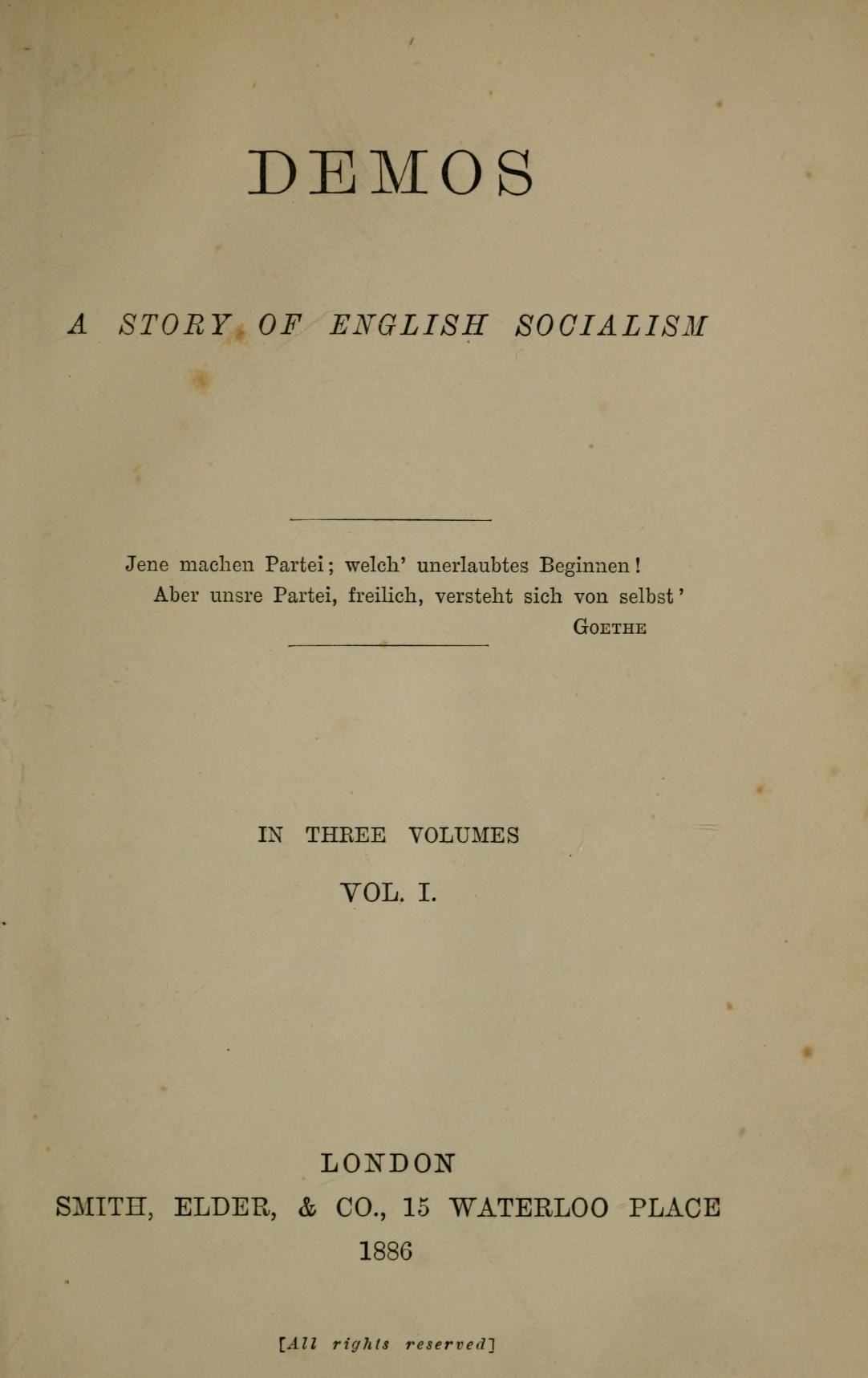
- Title page of the first edition.
- Author: George Gissing
- Language: English
- Publisher: Smith, Elder & Co.
- Publication date: 1886
- Publication place: England

Demos: A Story of English Socialism is a novel by the English author George Gissing. It is a story of the moral and intellectual corruption of a working-class socialist who inherits a fortune. It was written between late 1885 and March 1886 and first published in April 1886 by Smith, Elder & Co.

== Plot summary ==
The novel is set in Wanley, in the English Midlands, and in London. Wanley is a small village in a beautiful valley. Belwick, an industrial town, is nearby. The Eldon family are the historic owners of Wanley and live in Wanley Manor. They have fallen on hard times, and the manor and surrounding land are now owned by the self-made industrialist Richard Mutimer. Mutimer is a political conservative and has friendly relations with the Eldon family. The Waltham family also live in Wanley. It is assumed Hubert Eldon will inherit Mutimer's estate, and that he and Adela Waltham will marry.

At the start of the novel, old Richard Mutimer has recently died. No will is found and so he is assumed to have died intestate. A distant relative, also called Richard Mutimer, inherits his fortune. The latter Mutimer is a young, lower-class, socialist working-man

Mutimer decides to use his inheritance to set up New Wanley, an industrial settlement conducted on socialist principles. However, his new wealth and power serve to highlight the defects of character that he brings from his working-class origin. He begins to treat his workers harshly, and abandons Emma Vine, a girl of his own station to whom he has been engaged. Emma's sister, Jane, dies.

Mutimer marries Adela Waltham, an upper-middle-class woman (who does not love him) and stands for Parliament. Adela falls pregnant but the baby dies in childbirth. Mutimer's downfall begins when Adela finds the presumed-destroyed will of his relative. The will states that nearly the entire estate shall pass to the upper-class Hubert Eldon. Mutimer wants to destroy the will but Adela persuades him not to, and the money goes to the rightful heir. Eldon has New Wanley demolished. Richard and Adela Mutimer move to London, to live in relative poverty. Meanwhile, a more radical socialist movement led by "Comrade Roodhouse" comes to rival Mutimer's grouping. Roodhouse's party vehemently attacks Mutimer, in particular by asserting that he wrongfully accused Emma Vine of immorality.

Adela Mutimer increasingly loathes her husband. She develops a close relationship and infatuation with Stella Westlake. Emma Vine's other sister, Kate Clay, becomes an alcoholic and neglects her children, forcing Emma to care for them. Richard's sister, Alice, marries Willis Rodman, who is later revealed to be a fraudster and bigamist. Mutimer's younger brother, Harry, becomes a criminal and vagrant.

Mutimer starts another populist movement in London's East End. This has some genuine impact on poor people's lives and Mutimer becomes a popular speaker. But Mutimer is tricked into investing his supporters' money in a fraudulent company. After the fraud is revealed, Mutimer is killed by a stone thrown by a demonstrator after a meeting at which his followers turn against him.

At the end of the novel, Adela Waltham marries Hubert Eldon.

== Characters ==
=== Mutimer family ===
The Mutimers are a working class family who live in Wilton Square, Islington, London. A distant elderly relative, an industrialist also called Richard Mutimer, leaves the wealth which establishes the plot of the novel. This Mutimer does not appear as a character.

- Richard Mutimer: a socialist and former mechanical engineer.
- Alice Mutimer: Richard Mutimer's younger sister. She is nicknamed "Princess". At the start of the novel she is 19 and works in the show-rooms of a City warehouse
- Henry "'arry'" Mutimer: Richard Mutimer's younger brother. At the start of the novel he is employed as clerk in a drain-pipe manufactory.
- Mrs Mutimer: mother to the above. Mrs Mutimer receives the news of her children's inheritance with horror. She is relocated by her family to a house in the more-affluent Highbury, but chooses to return to Wilton Square and perform her own domestic chores.

=== Waltham family ===
The Walthams are an impoverished middle class family.

- Adela Waltham: a middle-class woman. Adela marries Mutimer after being coerced by her mother. At the end of the novel, Adela Waltham marries Hubert Eldon.
- Alfred Waltham: brother of Adela. Alfred works, successfully, in Belwick.
- Mrs Waltham: widow and mother to the above.

=== Eldon family ===
- Hubert Eldon: the only surviving son in the Eldon family. Hubert has traditional, conservative principles. At the start of the novel he has no fortune of his own.
- Mrs Eldon: mother to Hubert. Her husband and other son, Godfrey, are deceased.

=== Vine family ===
- Emma Vine: a working-class young woman. At the start of the novel Emma is engaged to Mutimer. Emma lives in dire poverty but is hardworking and virtuous.
- Jane Vine: Emma's constantly unwell sister.
- Kate Clay: Emma's other sister. Kate has two young children.

=== Other characters ===
- Rev. Wyvern: vicar of Wanley. Wyvern acts as a mouthpiece for Gissing's political views.
- Mr Westlake: leader of the socialist sect to which Mutimer belongs. Westlake is based on William Morris.
- Stella Westlake: wife of Mr Westlake.
- Mr Keene: a journalist.
- Willis Rodman: first introduced as the mining engineer at New Wanley.
- Letty Tew: friend of Adela. Tew marries Alfred Waltham.
