= The Unclassed =

1884 novel by George Gissing

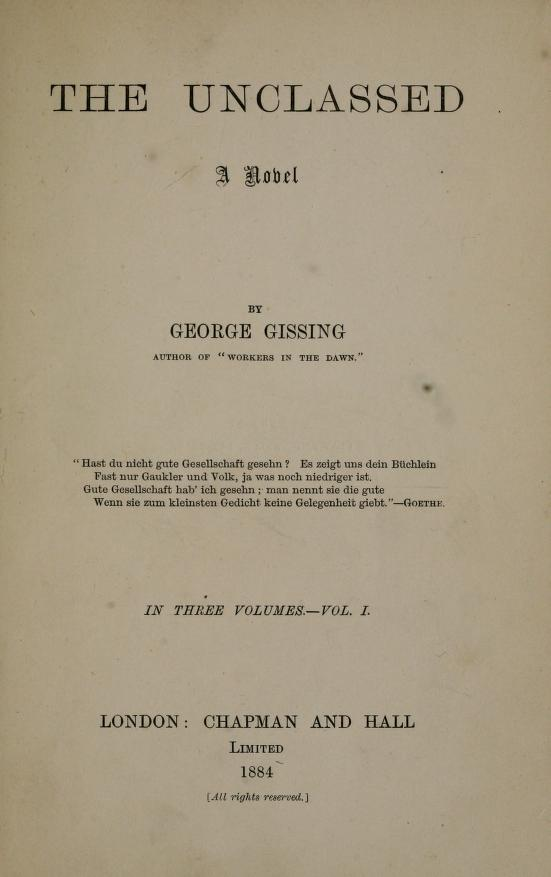
- Title page of the first edition of The Unclassed.
- Author: George Gissing
- Language: English
- Publisher: Chapman & Hall
- Publication date: 1884
- Publication place: England

The Unclassed is a novel by the English author George Gissing. It was written during 1883 but revised, at the publisher's insistence, in February 1884 and shortly before publication.

It tells the story of a young, educated man, Osmond Waymark, who survives by teaching. He answers a magazine advertisement, placed by Julian Casti – a half-Italian who had felt himself to be rejected by society – for companionship and the two strike up a serious and deep friendship.
