= The Private Papers of Henry Ryecroft =

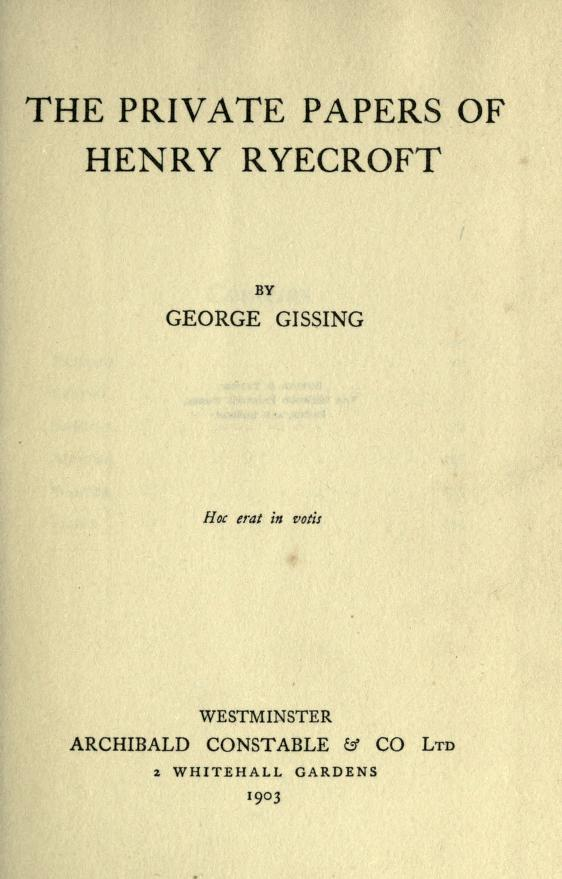
- Title page of the first edition of The Private Papers of Henry Ryecroft.
- Author: George Robert Gissing
- Language: English
- Genre: Journal
- Publisher: Archibald Constable
- Publication date: 1903
- Publication place: England

The Private Papers of Henry Ryecroft is a semi-fictional autobiographical work by George Gissing in which the author casts himself as the editor of the diary of a deceased acquaintance, selecting essays for posthumous publication. Observing "how suitable many of the reflections were to the month with which they were dated", he explains that he "hit upon the thought of dividing the little book into four chapters, named after the seasons".

It was partly because of the seasonal arrangement, and Ryecroft's obvious love of the natural world, that the book gained widespread popularity in Japan, being introduced as early as 1908 by the scholar of English literature Tokuboku Hirata (1873–1943). Other contributing factors were the classic unaffected style, which made the text suitable for educational and examination purposes, and Ryecroft's frank assessments of society and politics, which may have endeared him to the young academics of the country in the early part of the 20th century.
