= Denzil Doyle =

Prominent figure in the Ottawa technology community

- Born: 1932 or 1933 (age 93–94)
- Known for: Prominent figure in the Ottawa technology community
- Notable work: Making Technology Happen: How to find, exploit and manage innovative products, services and processes, Doyletech Corp, 6th ed.

Denzil Doyle C.M. is an electrical engineer and entrepreneur.

== Career ==
Doyle has become a prominent figure in the Ottawa technology community, having been the "founding president of Digital Equipment Corporation's Canadian subsidiary, one of the region's early high tech leaders. He ran the company for 18 years, during which annual sales reached $160 million." In his role with DEC he is especially notable for having brought together Canadian nuclear scientists with American DEC personnel to create the computers that evolved into the highly successful PDP-8 machines. Doyle is the Founder and Chairman of Doyletech Corporation, has been its President since November 1982. He is a Member of the Order of Canada.
