= Denzel Budde =

Dutch footballer

Personal information
- Full name: Denzel Budde
- Date of birth: April 8, 1997 (age 29)
- Place of birth: Lelystad, Netherlands
- Position: Rightback

Team information
- Current team: Unicum

Youth career
- 2006–2016: PEC Zwolle
- 2016–2017: ASV Dronten

Senior career*
Years	Team	Apps	(Gls)
2017–2018	Kortrijk	1	(0)
2019	Jong NEC	4	(0)
2020–2021	TEC	2	(0)
2021	Engordany	7	(0)
2021–	Unicum		
- * Club domestic league appearances and goals

Denzel Budde (born 8 April 1997) is a Dutch footballer who plays as a right back for Unicum Lelystad in the Tweede Klasse.

== Professional career ==
Budde was in the youth academy of PEC Zwolle for 10 years. Budde signed with ASV Dronten in the summer of 2016 from Zwolle, and after a successful season signed with the Belgian club K.V. Kortrijk. Budde made his debut for Kortrijk in a 0–2 Belgian First Division A loss to KV Mechelen on 4 November 2017, wherein he scored an own goal. Budde then joined TEC in 2020 and later had a spell in Andorra with Engordany.
