= Ispoure =

Ispoure Izpura
- Commune
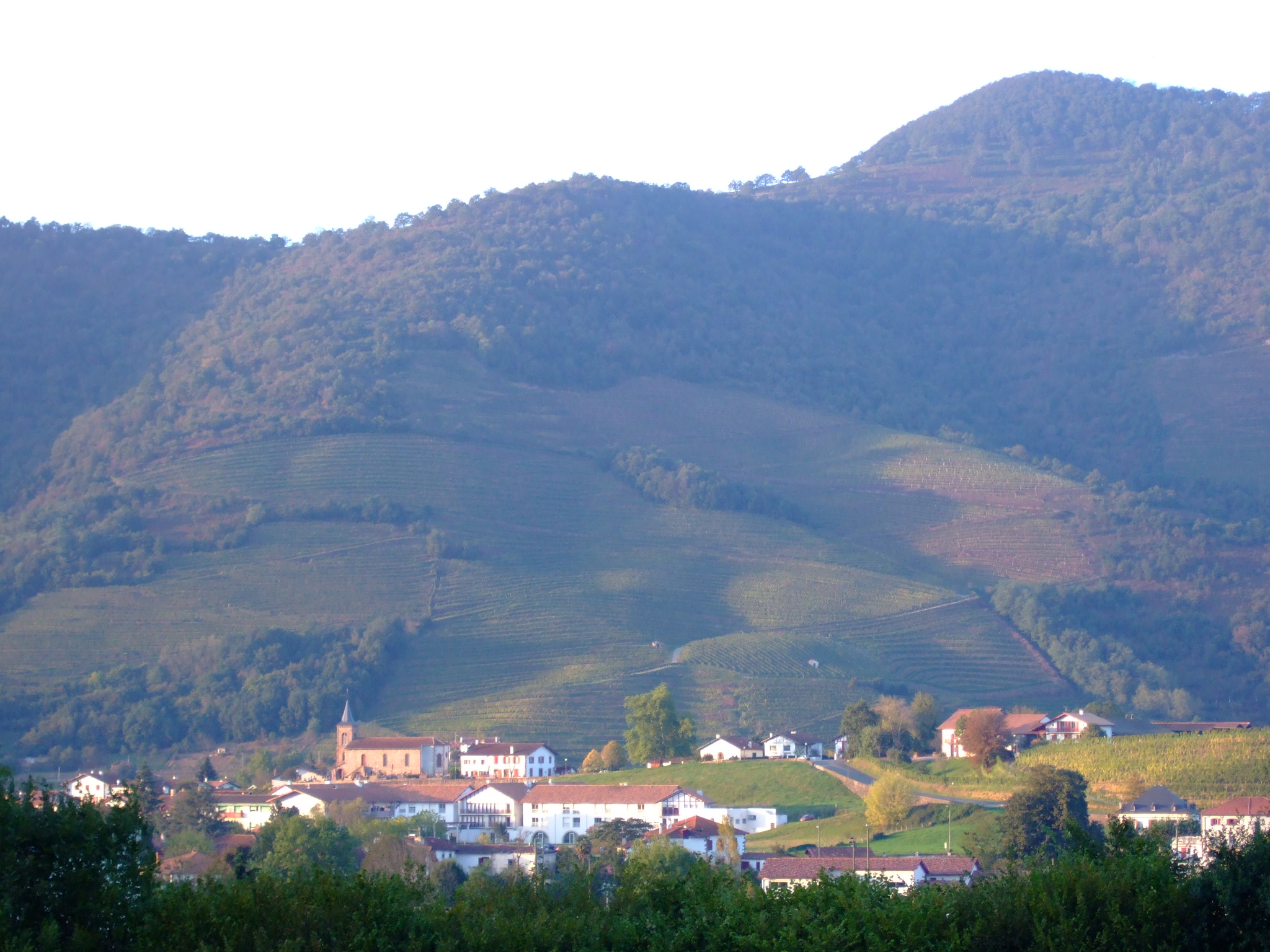
- A general view of Ispoure

- Coat of arms
- Location of Ispoure
- Location within France Location within Nouvelle-Aquitaine
- Coordinates: 43°10′19″N 1°13′59″W
- Country: France
- Region: Nouvelle-Aquitaine
- Department: Pyrénées-Atlantiques
- Arrondissement: Bayonne
- Canton: Montagne Basque
- Intercommunality: CA Pays Basque

Government
  - Mayor (2020–2026): Claude Barets
- Area^{1}: 7.85 km^{2} (3.03 sq mi)
- Elevation: 180 m (590 ft)
- Highest elevation: 660 m (2,170 ft)
- Lowest elevation: 130 m (430 ft)
- Population (2023): 667
  - Density: 85.0/km^{2} (220/sq mi)
- Time zone: UTC+01:00 (CET)
  - Summer (DST): UTC+02:00 (CEST)
- INSEE/Postal code: 64275 /64220
- ^{1} French Land Register data, which excludes lakes, ponds, glaciers > 1 km^{2} (0.386 sq mi or 247 acres) and river estuaries.

Ispoure (French pronunciation: [ispuʁ]; Occitan: Espora; Basque: Izpura) is a commune in the Pyrénées-Atlantiques department in south-western France.

It is located in the former province of Lower Navarre, part of the Basque Country, and historically has a high percentage of inhabitants of Cascarot descent.

== See also ==
- Communes of the Pyrénées-Atlantiques department
