= Denzil Quarrier =

1892 novel by George Gissing

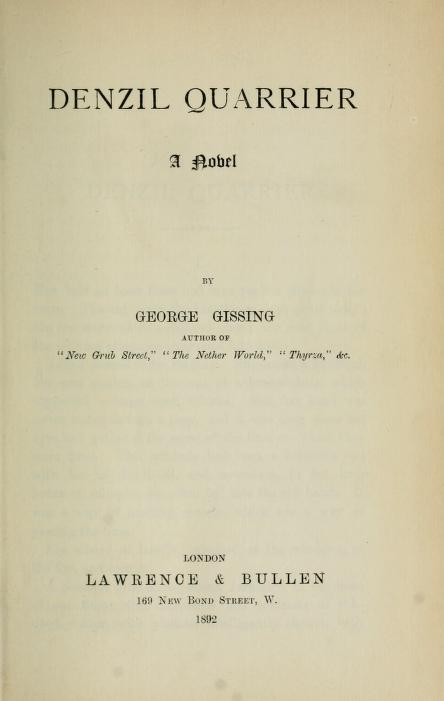
- Title page of the first edition
- Author: George Gissing
- Language: English
- Genre: Novel
- Publisher: Lawrence & Bullen
- Publication date: 1892
- Publication place: England
- Pages: 341

Denzil Quarrier is a novel written by the English author George Gissing, which was originally published in February 1892.
