= Kaanu Olaniyi =

Swiss professional basketball player (born 1998)

No. 21 – BC Boncourt
- Position: Center
- League: Swiss Basketball League

Personal information
- Born: March 27, 1998 (age 28) Riddes, Switzerland
- Listed height: 2.05 m (6 ft 9 in)
- Listed weight: 100 kg (220 lb)

Career information
- NBA draft: 2012: undrafted
- Playing career: 2013–present

Career history
- 2013: Blonay Basket
- 2013–2017: Élan Chalon
- 2017–2018: Union Neuchâtel
- 2019–present: →BC Boncourt

Kaanu Nelson Olaniyi (born March 27, 1998 - Riddes, Switzerland) is a Swiss professional basketball player who plays for BC Boncourt since 2018 of the Swiss Basketball League.

== Career ==
In 2013, Olaniyi moved from Switzerland to France to join first division club ES Chalon where he got trained in the youth movement.

In the summer of 2017/2018 season, Olaniyi returned to Switzerland and joined the Swiss Basketball League team Union Neuchâtel.

In the 2018/2019 season, he joined BC Boncourt to participate in the Swiss Basketball League regular season. In 2020, Olaniyi presented himself to the draft, but went undrafted.

== National team career ==
Olaniyi was a member of the Swiss national U20 team at the 2014 European Championship (Division B). In 2017, he was selected for the first time by the Senior Men's National Team.
