= Denzil Holles =

Denzil Holles may refer to:

- Denzil Holles (MP) (c. 1538–1590) MP for East Retford
- Denzil Holles, 1st Baron Holles (1599–1680), English statesman and writer
- Denzil Holles, 3rd Baron Holles (1675–c. 1692), English statesman
