= Eve's Ransom =

1895 novel by George Gissing

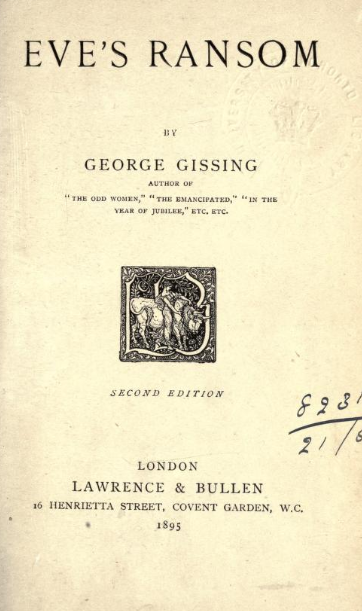
- Title page for Eve's Ransom (1895)
- Author: George Gissing
- Language: English
- Publisher: Lawrence & Bullen
- Publication date: 1895
- Publication place: UK
- Pages: 379

Eve's Ransom is a novel by George Gissing, first published in 1895 as a serialisation in the Illustrated London News. It features the story of a mechanical draughtsman named Maurice Hilliard, who comes into some money, which enables him to live without working. As part of his resulting travels, he meets and falls in love with Eve Madeley, a book keeper.

Eve's Ransom was published in a single-volume edition immediately after the conclusion of its serialisation, which was unusual at the time. The novel sold well, and a second edition soon followed, although critics were divided in their opinion of the work.

== Plot ==
Maurice Hilliard is a mechanical draughtsman producing technical drawings on an annual income of £100. He longs to be free from the monotony of his life and work, and is led by his feelings of hopelessness into drinking alcohol. While travelling by train one day, he meets Mr Dengate, a former debtor to his deceased father. As Dengate was bankrupt at the point of Hilliard's father's death, the debt was not repaid, but as they meet on the train, Hilliard shames Dengate into repaying the debt of £436. Hilliard then commits to the plan of living without working, as a "free" human being, for as long as the money lasts.

First travelling to London, and then to Paris, Hilliard eventually returns to his family home in Dudley, feeling lonely. He discovers a portrait of a young woman and decides to find her. Eventually, he succeeds in his plan. The woman, Eve Madeley, works as a book keeper, with an income of £1 per week. Like Hilliard had previously done, she is despairing about her future. Eve tells Hilliard that they would not be able to marry, as his income is too small, but she does agree to travel to Paris with him. They are accompanied by Eve's friend Patty Ringrose. While in Paris, Hilliard falls in love with Eve.

== Background and publication ==
Gissing wrote Eve's Ransom in a period of twenty-five days in 1894, finishing on 29 June. The work had been commissioned by C.K. Shorter to appear as a serial in the Illustrated London News, scheduled to begin in October 1894, although the actual publication was delayed due to difficulties in obtaining adequate illustrations. Shorter initially approached Fred Barnard, who had previously illustrated works by Charles Dickens, to illustrate the serial, but Gissing was not satisfied with the drawings Barnard produced. When Gissing went to discuss this with Barnard, he found that he was living in a state of drunkenness and poverty, unable to continue with the project. Another artist was chosen to replace Barnard, and the 13-part serial of Eve's Ransom eventually appeared in the Illustrated London News between January and March 1895. It was printed in a single volume by Lawrence and Bullen in April 1895. A second edition followed in the same month. It was unusual for serialised works to be published in their entirety immediately after their serialisation, and Gissing felt obliged to write a letter of apology to Shorter as a result.

== Reception ==
Writing in the Saturday Review, H. G. Wells described Eve's Ransom as "remarkably well done". However, he criticised Gissing for not including "some flash of joy or humour" in the book and questioned whether, despite its apparent realism, it was "really representative of life". Wells suggested that this was a recurring issue with Gissing's novels, which reduced them "from the faithful representation of life to...the genre of nervous exhaustion".

A reviewer in The Morning Post suggested that many readers would be "disappointed" by Eve's Ransom, due to its lack of human interest and its unsatisfying characters. The reviewer lamented the fact that Gissing had overlooked "elements of the human drama...and contented himself with writing merely a clever novel".

The Manchester Guardian featured a more positive review, which suggested that, unlike Gissing's previous novels, it is "possessed of just that subtle power of arresting the attention and arousing the sympathies of the reader". The Bookman described it as a "strong and impressive story, and one that holds the attention of the reader to the end".
