= George Gissing =

English novelist, short story writer and literary critic (1857–1903)

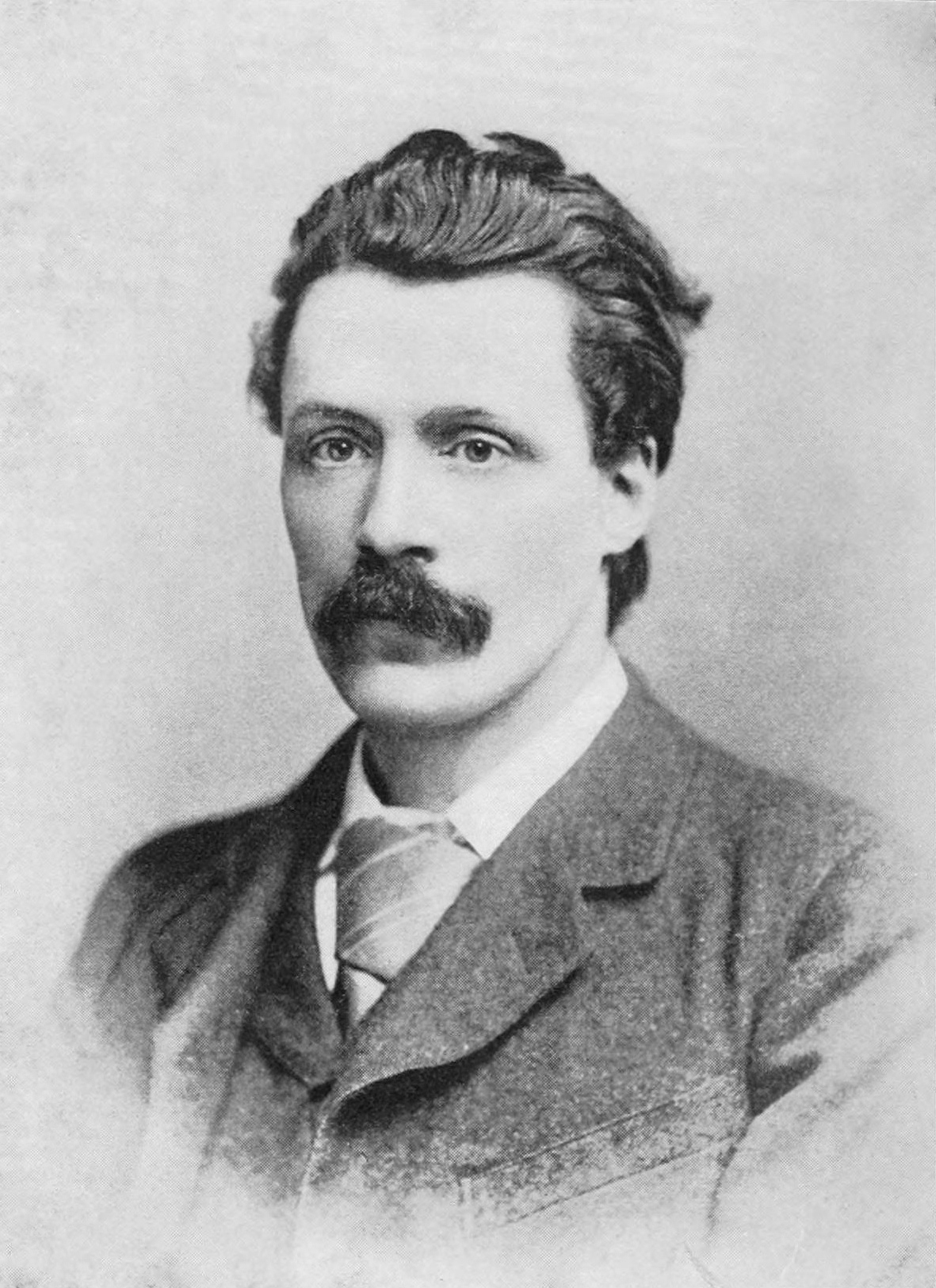
- Gissing c. 1880
- Born: George Robert Gissing; 22 November 1857; Wakefield, Yorkshire, England
- Died: 28 December 1903 (aged 46); Ispoure, Saint-Jean-Pied-de-Port, France
- Writing career
- Notable works: The Nether World (1889); New Grub Street (1891); Born in Exile (1892); The Odd Women (1893)
- Movement: Naturalism

Signature
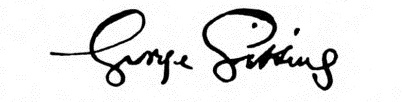

George Robert Gissing (/ˈɡɪsɪŋ/ GHISS-ing; 22 November 1857 – 28 December 1903) was an English novelist, who published 23 novels between 1880 and 1903. Gissing's best-known works include The Nether World (1889), New Grub Street (1891), Born in Exile (1892) and The Odd Women (1893).

== Biography ==
=== Early life ===
Gissing was born on 22 November 1857 in Wakefield, West Yorkshire, the eldest of five children of Thomas Waller Gissing, who ran a chemist's shop, and Margaret (née Bedford). His siblings were: William, who died aged twenty; Algernon, who became a writer; Margaret; and Ellen. His childhood home in Thompson's Yard, Wakefield, is maintained by The Gissing Trust.

Gissing was educated at Back Lane School in Wakefield, where he was a diligent and enthusiastic student. His serious interest in books began at the age of ten when he read The Old Curiosity Shop by Charles Dickens and subsequently, encouraged by his father and inspired by the family library, his literary interest grew. Juvenilia written at this time was published in 1995 in The Poetry of George Gissing. He was also skilled at drawing. Gissing's father died when he was 12 years old, and he and his brothers were sent to Lindow Grove School at Alderley Edge in Cheshire, where he was a solitary student who studied hard.

In 1872, after an exceptional performance in the Oxford Local Examinations, Gissing won a scholarship to Owens College, the forerunner of the Victoria University of Manchester, subsequently merged with University of Manchester Institute of Science and Technology to form the University of Manchester. There he continued his intense studies, and won many prizes, including the Poem Prize in 1873 and the Shakespeare scholarship in 1875. He also began a relationship with Marianne "Nell" Harrison.

When he ran short of money and stole from his fellow students, Gissing's academic career ended in disgrace. The college hired a detective to investigate the thefts, and Gissing was prosecuted, found guilty, expelled, and sentenced to a month's hard labour in Belle Vue Gaol, Manchester, in 1876.

In September 1876, with support from sympathisers, he travelled to the United States, where he spent time in Boston and Waltham, Massachusetts, writing and teaching classics. When his money ran out, he moved to Chicago, where he earned a precarious living writing short stories for newspapers, including the Chicago Tribune. He lived in poverty until he met a travelling salesman in need of an assistant, and Gissing demonstrated his products. These experiences partially inspired his 1891 novel, New Grub Street. In September 1877, Gissing left America and returned to England. (Note: Incorrectly, biographers Austin Harrison and Frank Arthur Swinnerton suggested that Gissing travelled to the town of Jena in Germany and studied the works of philosophers such as Arthur Schopenhauer and Auguste Comte before returning home, providing Gissing with the background for a character's visit to Germany in his novel Workers in the Dawn in 1880 but the details were provided by his friend Eduard Bertz and a note about travel plans in Gissing's notebook provides evidence of his direct voyage to England.)

=== Literary career ===
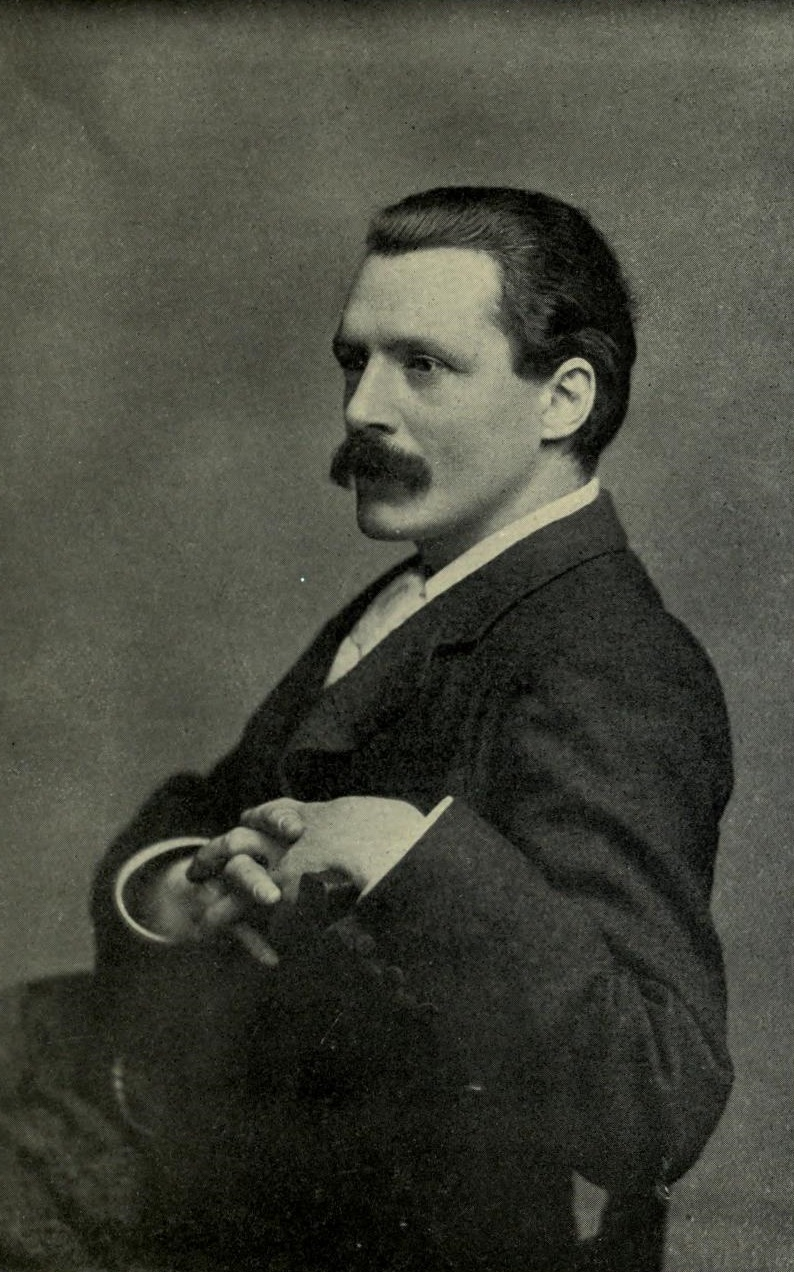
Gissing photo by Elliott & Fry

After returning to England, Gissing settled in London with Nell, writing fiction and working as a private tutor. He failed to get his first novel Workers in the Dawn accepted by a publisher and published it privately, funding it with money from an inheritance. Gissing married Nell on 27 October 1879. Their marriage was plagued with poverty and they were frequently separated while Nell was hospitalised for poor health. One of his friends was a fellow author and Owens College alumnus Morley Roberts, who wrote a novel based on Gissing's life, The Private Life of Henry Maitland, in 1912. He was friends with Eduard Bertz, a German socialist with whom he became acquainted in 1879. Gissing spent much time reading classical authors at the British Museum Reading Room, as well as coaching students for examinations. He took long walks through the streets of London observing the poor. In his reading, John Forster's Life of Dickens particularly interested him. He wrote in his diary entry for 23 January 1888 that Forster's work was "a book I constantly take up for impulse, when work is at a standstill'.

According to his pupil Austin Harrison, from 1882 Gissing made a decent living by teaching; tales of a fight with poverty, including some of his own remembrances, were untrue. Gissing often claimed poverty to his family, whom he largely supported, in order to discourage them from asking for assistance, and the issue of his supposed poverty may be explained by Gissing's attitude to teaching, which he felt to be an inferior profession, somewhat beneath him. He was also guilty of extravagance and poor management of his finances.

Gissing's next novel, Mrs Grundy's Enemies, remained unpublished like the first, although bought for publication by Bentley & Son in 1882. George Bentley decided against publishing it despite revisions that Gissing made. Before his next novel, The Unclassed, was published in 1884, Gissing and his wife separated, largely because Gissing would not give the time and energy to support her through increasingly chronic ill-health. He continued to pay a small alimony until her death in 1888. Between his return to England and publication of The Unclassed, Gissing wrote 11 short stories, but only "Phoebe" appeared at the time, in the March 1884 issue of Temple Bar.

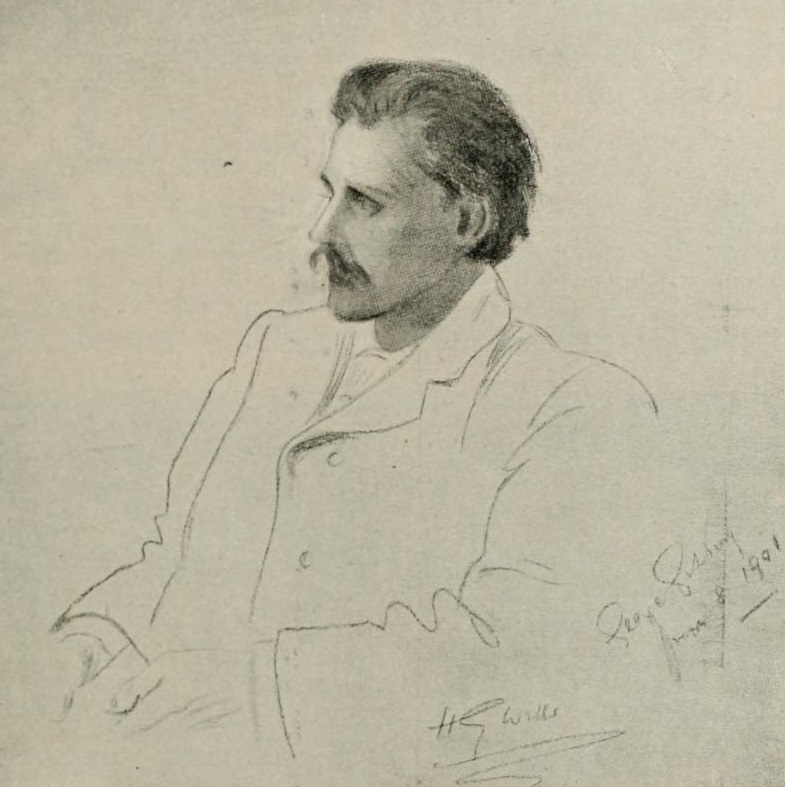
Portrait of Gissing in 1901

The years after the publication of The Unclassed brought great literary activity. Isabel Clarendon and Demos appeared in 1886; Demos began a relationship with Smith, Elder & Co., which published him until New Grub Street in 1891. The novels he wrote in this period depict a conservative view of the working class. Gissing used £150 earned from the rights to The Nether World in 1889 to fund a long-awaited trip to Italy to pursue his interest in the classics. His experiences there formed a basis for the 1890 work The Emancipated.

On 25 February 1891, Gissing married another working-class woman, Edith Alice Underwood. They settled in Exeter but moved to Brixton in June 1893 and Epsom in 1894. They had two children, Walter Leonard (1891–1916) and Alfred Charles Gissing (1896–1975), but the marriage was unsuccessful. Edith did not understand his work and Gissing insisted on keeping them socially isolated from his peers, which exacerbated the problems. Whereas Nell was too sick to complain about his controlling behaviour, some historians believe Edith stood up to him argumentatively. She may have gone into violent, uncontrolled rages as Gissing claimed in letters to Bertz, but the truth is elusive at this distance in time. Gissing took revenge (or acted to protect their older child from continual violent assaults, since he stated in letters his safety was in danger) in April 1896, when Walter was spirited away without Edith's knowledge and sent to stay with Gissing's sisters in Wakefield. Gissing pleaded Edith's violence, but he strongly disliked the way she presented him to his son. Alfred, the younger child, remained with his mother. The couple separated in 1897, though this was no clean break - Gissing spent time dodging Edith and afraid she might seek a reconciliation. In 1902, Edith was certified insane and confined to an asylum. At this time Gissing met and befriended Clara Collet who was probably in love with him, although it is unclear whether he reciprocated. They remained friends for the rest of his life, and after his death she helped to support Edith and the children.

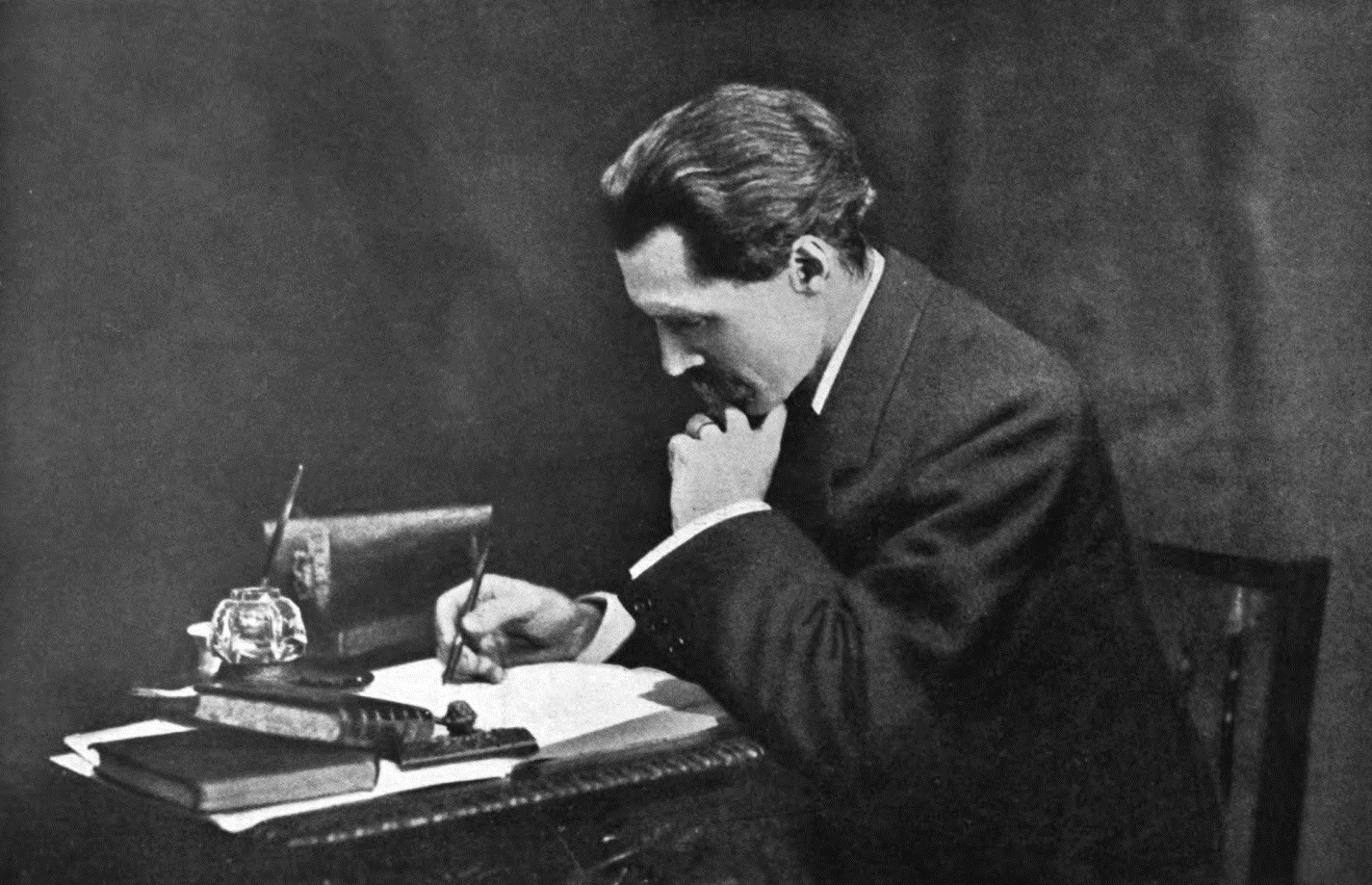
Gissing at desk

Gissing's work began to be paid better. New Grub Street (1891) brought him £250. In 1892 he befriended and was influenced in his work by a fellow writer, George Meredith. In the 1890s Gissing lived more comfortably on his earnings, but his health suffered, which limited the time he spent in London. Novels from the period include Born in Exile (1892), The Odd Women (1893), In the Year of Jubilee (1894) and The Whirlpool (1897). From 1893, Gissing also wrote short stories, some of which were collected in an 1898 volume, Human Odds and Ends, and others in volumes published after his death. In 1895, he published three novellas, Eve's Ransom, The Paying Guest and Sleeping Fires. This too reflected changing tastes in the reading public, away from three-volume novels.

In 1897 Gissing met H. G. Wells and his wife, who spent the spring with him and his sister at Budleigh Salterton. Wells said Gissing was "no longer the glorious, indefatigable, impracticable youth of the London flat, but a damaged and ailing man, full of ill-advised precautions against the imaginary illnesses that were his interpretations of a general malaise."

=== Later years ===
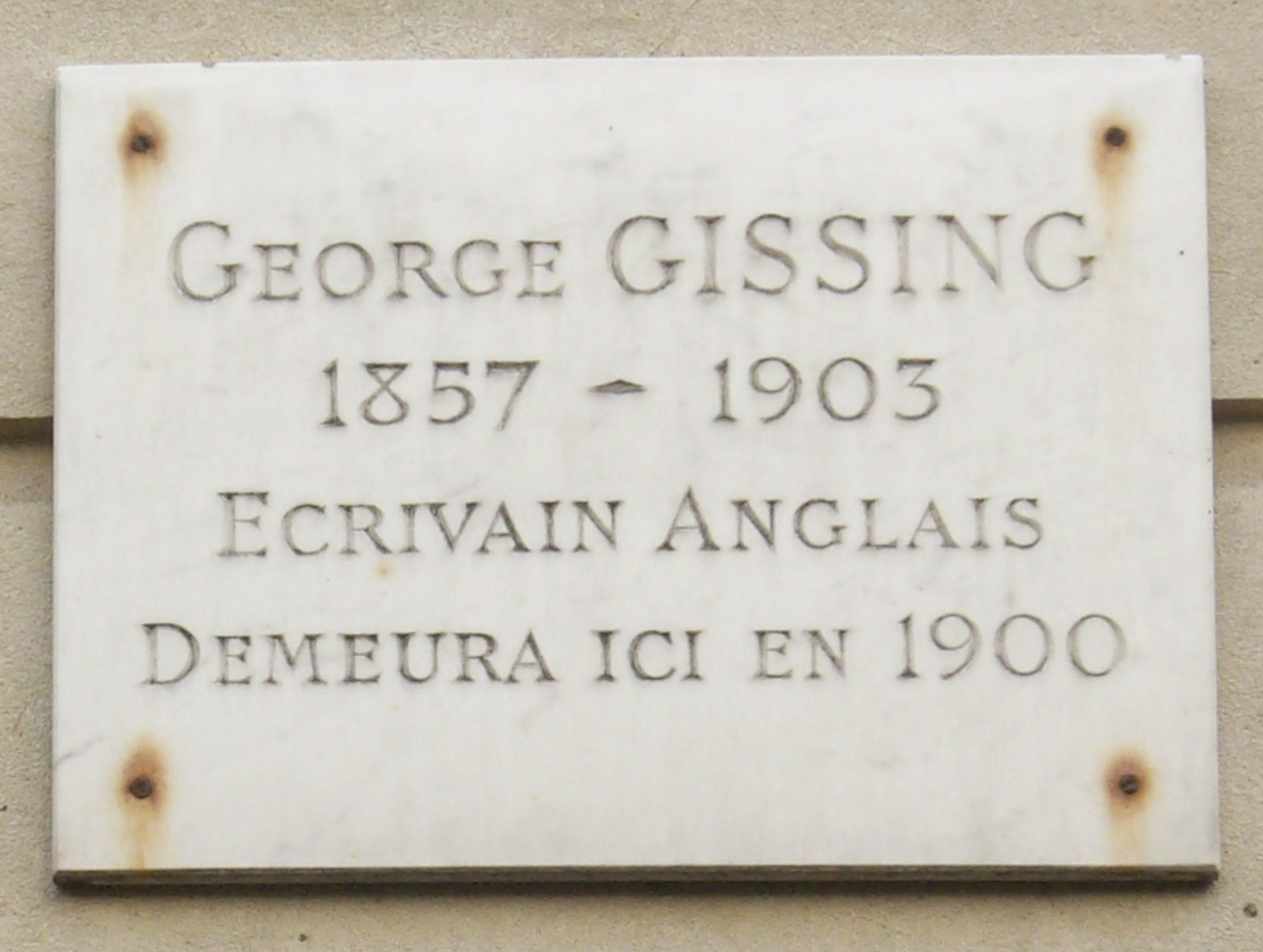
Commemorative plaque, 13 Rue de Siam, Paris 16th: "George Gissing, 1857–1903, English writer, lived here in 1900"

After separating from Edith, Gissing revisited Italy in 1897–1898, as told in a travel book, By the Ionian Sea (1901). While in Siena he wrote Charles Dickens: a Critical Study. In Rome he met H. G. Wells and his wife and did research for a romantic novel set in the 6th century, Veranilda. Meanwhile The Town Traveller, written in the final months of his marriage in 1897, was published. After a short stay with his friend Bertz in Potsdam, he returned to England in 1898 and moved to Dorking in Surrey.

In July 1898, Gissing met Gabrielle Marie Edith Fleury (1868–1954), a Frenchwoman who approached him for permission to translate New Grub Street. Ten months later, they became partners in a common-law marriage, as Gissing did not divorce Edith. They moved to France, where he remained, returning to England briefly in 1901 for a six-week stay in a sanatorium in Nayland, Suffolk. The couple settled in Paris, but moved to Arcachon when Gissing's health deteriorated. The final years of his life were spent in the villages of Ciboure, near St Jean-de-Luz, and Ispoure, near Saint-Jean-Pied-de-Port.

Gissing's relations with Fleury provided inspiration for his 1899 novel The Crown of Life. He wrote several novels during his third marriage, including Among the Prophets, which remained unpublished and has not survived, Our Friend the Charlatan (1901) and Will Warburton (published posthumously in 1905). Gissing worked on his historical novel Veranilda, but it was unfinished when he died. In 1903, he published The Private Papers of Henry Ryecroft, written in 1900–1901 and appearing initially as a serial entitled "An author at grass" in the Fortnightly Review. It consists of imaginary autobiographical essays from a once-struggling writer who has inherited a legacy enabling him to retire in the countryside. It brought Gissing much acclaim.

Apart from fiction, Gissing followed up his study of Dickens with further writings, including introductions to editions of Dickens's works, articles for journals and a revised edition of John Forster's Dickens biography.

Gissing died aged 46 on 28 December 1903 having caught a chill on an ill-advised winter walk. He is buried in the English cemetery at Saint-Jean-de-Luz. Veranilda was published incompletely in 1904. H. G. Wells, after a Christmas Eve telegram, came to Gissing at Saint-Jean-Pied-de-Port in his final days and helped to nurse him. Wells characterized him as a "flimsy inordinate stir of grey matter", and wrote of Gissing's "poor vexed brain—so competent for learning and aesthetic reception, so incompetent, so impulsive and weakly yielding under the real stresses of life", adding: "He was a pessimistic writer. He spent his big fine brain depreciating life because he would not and perhaps could not look life squarely in the eyes — neither his circumstances nor the conventions about him nor the adverse things about him nor the limitations of his personal character. But whether it was nature or education that made this tragedy I cannot tell." Will Warburton was published in 1905, as was his final volume, the short-story collection The House of Cobwebs.

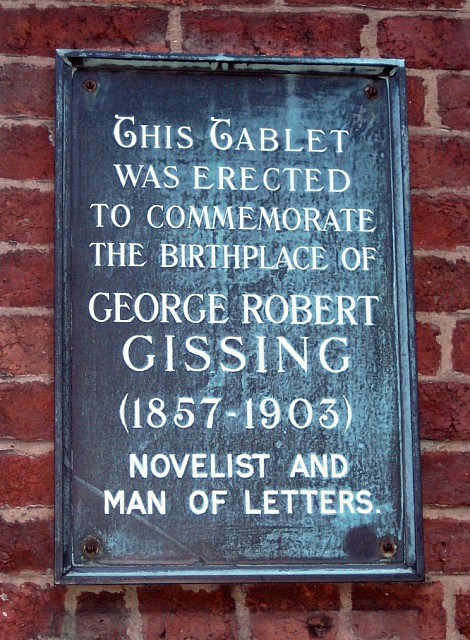
Commemorative tablet at Gissing's birthplace

Gissing is prominent in Russell Kirk's The Conservative Mind. He was also said to be George Orwell's favorite writer. His conservatism was rooted in his aristocratic sensibility. After a brief youthful flirtation with socialism, Gissing lost faith in the labour movements and scorned the popular enthusiasms of his day. In 1892, he told his sister Ellen, "I fear we shall live through great troubles yet... We cannot resist it, but I throw what weight I may have on the side of those who believe in an aristocracy of brains, as against the brute domination of the quarter-educated mob." In The Private Papers of Henry Ryecroft, Gissing reflected, "To think I once called myself a socialist, communist, anything you like of the revolutionary kind! Not for long, to be sure, and I suspect there was always something in me that scoffed when my lips uttered such things." In a fictionalised biography of Gissing, The Private Life of Henry Maitland, his friend Morley Roberts commented:

He had once, as he owned, been touched by Socialism, probably of a purely academic kind; and yet, when he was afterwards withdrawn from such stimuli as had influenced him to think for once in terms of sociology, he went back to his more natural despairing conservative frame of mind. He lived in the past, and was conscious every day that something in the past that he loved was dying and must vanish. No form of future civilisation, whatever it might be, which was gained by means implying the destruction of what he chiefly loved, could ever appeal to him. He was not even able to believe that the gross and partial education of the populace was better than no education at all, in that it must someday inevitably lead to better education and a finer type of society. It was for that reason that he was a conservative. But he was the kind of conservative who would now be repudiated by those who call themselves such, except perhaps in some belated and befogged country house.

== Reception ==
Gissing's early novels were ill-received, but greater recognition came in the 1890s in England and overseas. The increased popularity affected his novels, the short stories he wrote in the period, and his friendships with influential, respected literary figures such as the journalist Henry Norman, author J. M. Barrie and writer and critic Edmund Gosse. By the end of the century, critics placed him with Thomas Hardy and George Meredith as one of the three leading novelists in England. Sir William Robertson Nicoll called him "one of the most original, daring and conscientious workers in fiction". Chesterton saw in him the "soundest of the Dickens critics, a man of genius". George Orwell admired him and in a 1943 Tribune article called him "perhaps the best novelist England has produced," believing his masterpieces were the "three novels, The Odd Women, Demos, and New Grub Street, and his book on Dickens. [The novels'] central theme can be stated in three words — 'not enough money'."

== Style ==
The traditional view of critics is that Émile Zola was a primary influence on Gissing, but Jacob Korg suggests that George Eliot was a greater influence.

== The Gissing Journal ==
The Gissing Journal, a quarterly single-author journal devoted to the life and works of George Gissing, publishes essays, and book reviews. It appeared in January 1965, with Jacob Korg of the University of Washington as editor until December 1968. He was followed from January 1969 to April 2013 by Pierre Coustillas, emeritus professor of English at the University of Lille, and from July 2013 by Malcolm Allen of the University of Wisconsin. However, Allen was only able to produce six issues and it ceased publication in December 2014. Markus Neacey, a regular contributor and independent Gissing scholar, restarted The Gissing Journal as editor in January 2017. He had in 2016 written a history and index of The Gissing Journal.

The Gissing Journal is indexed by the Modern Language Association, reviewed annually by The Year's Work in English Studies and regularly mentioned in the Times Literary Supplement. The contents up to 2008 can be read on The Gissing in Cyberspace website.

== Works ==
Novels

- Workers in the Dawn, 3 vols, 1880
- The Unclassed, 3 vols, 1884
- Isabel Clarendon, 2 vols, 1885
- Demos, 3 vols, 1886
- Thyrza, 3 vols, 1887
- A Life's Morning, 3 vols, 1888
- The Nether World, 3 vols, 1889
- The Emancipated, 3 vols, 1890
- New Grub Street, 3 vols, 1891
- Denzil Quarrier, 1892
- Born in Exile, 3 vols, 1892
- The Odd Women, 3 vols, 1893
- In the Year of Jubilee, 3 vols, 1894
- Eve's Ransom, 1895
- The Paying Guest, 1895
- Sleeping Fires, 1895
- The Whirlpool, 1897
- The Town Traveller, 1898
- The Crown of Life, 1899
- Our Friend the Charlatan, 1901
- The Private Papers of Henry Ryecroft, 1903
- Veranilda, 1904 (unfinished)
- Will Warburton, 1905 (published posthumously)

Travel

- By the Ionian Sea, 1901

Criticism

- Charles Dickens: A Critical Study, 1898

Short story collections

- Human Odds and Ends, 1898 (short stories)
- The House of Cobwebs and other stories, 1906 (15 short stories)
- Letters to Edward Clodd, 1914
- Letters to an Editor, 1915
- The Sins of the Fathers and Other Tales, 1924
- The Immortal Dickens, 1925
- A Victim of Circumstances and Other Stories, 1927
- A Yorkshire Lass, 1928
- Brownie, 1931 (seven stories for the Chicago Tribune, c. 1876–1877)
- Stories and Sketches, 1938 (with preface by Alfred C. Gissing)
- Essays and Fiction, 1970
- My First Rehearsal and My Clerical Rival, 1970

=== Selected short stories ===
- "Lou and Liz," The English Illustrated Review, Vol. X, 1893
- "Our Mr. Jupp," The English Illustrated Review, Vol. XI, 1894
- "The Pessimist of Plato Road," The English Illustrated Review, Vol. XII, 1894
- "A Capitalist," The National Review, Vol. XXIII, 1894
- "The Poet's Portmanteau," The English Illustrated Review, Vol. XII, 1895
- "In Honour Bound," The English Illustrated Review, Vol. XIII, 1895
- "The Foolish Virgin," The Yellow Book, Vol. VIII, January 1896
- "Great Men in Little Worlds," Part II, Part III, Part IV, Part V, The English Illustrated Review, Vol. XV, 1896
- "The Light on the Tower," The English Illustrated Review, Vol. XVI, 1897
- "Spellbound," The English Illustrated Review, Vol. XVIII, 1897
- "One Way of Happiness," The English Illustrated Review, Vol. XIX, 1898
- "A Despot on Tour," Strand Magazine, Vol. XV, 1898

== See also ==
- Alfred Gissing, his son
- Algernon Gissing, his younger brother
- Jane Gissing, his granddaughter
