= The Nether World =

1889 novel by George Gissing

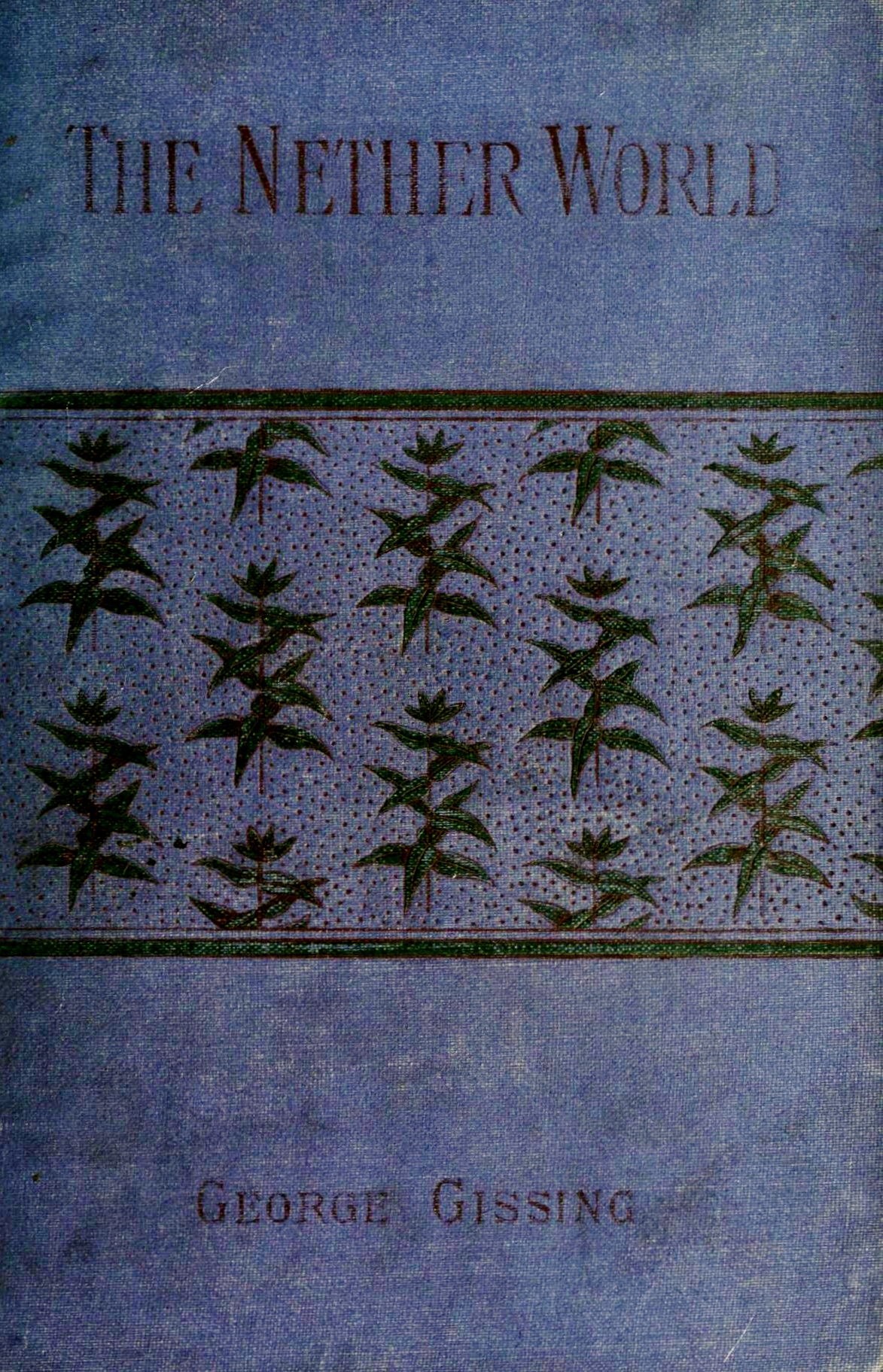
- First edition cover
- Author: George Gissing
- Language: English
- Publisher: Smith, Elder & Co.
- Publication date: 1889
- Publication place: England
- ISBN: 978-0-19-953828-7 (Oxford University Press paperback edition, 2008)

The Nether World is a novel written in 1889 by the English author George Gissing. The plot concerns several poor families living in the slums of 19th-century London. Rich in naturalistic detail, the novel concentrates on the individual problems and hardships which result from the typical shortages experienced by the lower classes—want of money, employment and decent living conditions. The Nether World is pessimistic and concerns exclusively the lives of poor people: there is no juxtaposition with the world of the rich.

== Plot summary ==
The old Michael Snowdon returns from Australia to London after inheriting a substantial sum of money from his deceased son. Despite being able to live a comfortable, if not luxurious life, he spends only on necessities and lives like a poor man, keeping his fortune secret. In London he finds his granddaughter, Jane, a weak child whom he rescues from the tyranny of the Peckovers (mother and daughter), in whose house she is employed as a household drudge. Jane's father, Joseph, is another son of Michael's who disappeared a few years ago in search of work, leaving Jane with the Peckovers. Michael nurtures a plan to bestow his fortune on Jane after his death, but he wants Jane to spend this money on charity and social work rather than on her own needs. He engages Jane in charitable activities and everyday work even before he reveals the secret of his wealth to her, trying to inculcate to her the principles of benevolence.

Joseph Snowdon returns suddenly to London. Formerly he argued with his father and is not on amiable terms with him. Joseph is preyed upon by the young Clem Peckover who marries him after she and her mother begin suspecting that Joseph's father is rich. Michael receives Joseph reservedly, without revealing intent of sharing the fortune with him. Joseph, pestered by his disappointed wife, also believes that Michael is rich, and tries to win his father's respect by improving relations with Jane. He also befriends Jane's older friend, Sidney Kirkwood. Sidney, an honest and sympathetic character, apparently intends to marry Jane in the future, unaware of Michael's fortune. Joseph fears that if Sidney, Michael's favorite, marries Jane, then Michael will leave most of the fortune to the young couple. He therefore develops a plan to make Clara Hewett, Sidney's former love, more fond of Sidney, and catalyze their marriage.

Clara Hewett is a young attractive woman who left her poor family with an intention of becoming a famous actress and escaping poverty. Clara's brother Bob, a promising artist, chooses to remain in the same social class: he marries a poor and unfortunate girl, Pennyloaf, whom he does not love. When Clara was living with her family, she, proud and ambitious, scorned the attention of Sidney. Sidney is a friend of her father John and the two quarrel because of Clara after she left. John believes that the loss of his daughter is Sidney's fault. Later, when John's sickly wife dies, Sidney helps the struggling Hewett family with some of his savings, and John becomes contrite about his earlier misunderstanding of Sidney's nature. In search of fame and fortune Clara joins a traveling theatre and shows talent, but her plans are thwarted by a rival actress who, jealous of Clara's success, disfigures Clara's face with acid. Clara is admitted to a hospital, and Joseph informs John anonymously of her whereabouts. Clara is taken home, but now that all her hopes for better life are ended, she starts re-evaluating her ungratefulness towards her father and Sidney, and also contemplates suicide.

Meanwhile, Michael reveals his secret separately to Jane and Sidney and emphasizes his plan for how the fortune should be spent. At first, Sidney seems to like the idea of life's work for charity, but later believes that Michael's plan is futile and that the money should rather be spent on Jane's education and her enjoyment of life. Disagreeing with Michael's plans, and feeling that his dignity is compromised by Joseph's broaching the question of the old man's money, Sidney reduces his relationship with Jane and instead offers marriage to Clara who accepts it gratefully.

Jane, heartbroken and uncertain of her firmness to carry out Michael's plan, becomes disfavored by the old man. After his explanation with Jane, Michael destroys his will, contemplates the matter, but before he can compose a new will he suffers a stroke and dies. In the absence of a will, the scheming Joseph inherits all the money. His wife is making plans to kill him, but Joseph escapes abroad with the money, content to leave Jane only a small pension.

The novel has a tragic end for all its characters. Sidney and Clara have an unhappy marriage exacerbated by material wants. Jane rejects her father's pension after discovering his intrigues and declines an offer of marriage from a well-to-do business clerk, thus accepting a life of toil. Bob Hewett largely abandons his wife and children and dies fleeing arrest for forging coins. Clem is accused of trying to poison her mother and is tried in court. Joseph's fortune is squandered in the financial markets of the United States, a misfortune that he cannot survive.

The Nether World opens near Clerkenwell Close in central London, and throughout the novel focusses on the Clerkenwell area, then largely working class and a centre of workshop and small factory trades. The novel is remarkable for its very strong sense of place.
