= Denzil Thompson =

Guyanese footballer and manager

Personal information
- Place of birth: Guyana
- Position: Goalkeeper

International career
Years	Team	Apps	(Gls)
198x–199x	Guyana		

Managerial career
- 2014–2015: Guyana

Denzil Thompson is a former international footballer and the current manager of the Guyana national football team.

== Career ==
He played as a goalkeeper. Thompson was involved in the 1982 FIFA World Cup qualification campaign for Guyana playing in two games against Suriname.

In August 2014, he was appointed as coach of the Guyana national football team. He took control of the national team for the 2014 Caribbean Cup qualification campaign.
