= New Grub Street =

1891 novel by George Gissing

- New Grub Street by George Gissing, Penguin Classics edition 1985
- Author: George Gissing
- Language: English
- Genre: Novel
- Publisher: London: Smith, Elder & Co. (3 volumes); Troy, N.Y.: C.A. Brewster, 1904 (1 volume)
- Publication date: 1891
- Publication place: United Kingdom
- Media type: Print (Hardback & Paperback)
- ISBN: 0-375-76110-1
- OCLC: 50243452
- Dewey Decimal: 823/.8 21
- LC Class: PR4716 .N48 2002

New Grub Street is a British novel by George Gissing published in 1891, which is set in the literary and journalistic circles of 1880s London. The story deals with the literary world that Gissing himself had experienced. Its title refers to the London street, Grub Street, which in the 18th century became synonymous with hack literature, although by Gissing's time, Grub Street itself no longer existed. Gissing revised and shortened the novel for a French edition of 1901.

== Synopsis ==
The novel's two central characters are a sharply contrasted pair of writers: Edwin Reardon, a novelist of some talent but limited commercial prospects, and a shy, cerebral man; and Jasper Milvain, a young journalist, hard-working and capable of generosity, but cynical and only semi-scrupulous about writing and its purpose in the modern (i.e. late Victorian) world. The story opens with Milvain, an "alarmingly modern young man" driven by pure financial ambition in navigating his literary career. He accepts that he will "always despise the people [he] write[s] for," networks within the appropriate social circle to create opportunity, and authors articles for popular periodicals.

Reardon had an earlier success with his third novel, On Neutral Ground, and prefers to write novels of a more literary bent and refuses to pander to contemporary tastes. However, since the earlier novel, he is continuously unable to write a new work. As a last-gasp measure against financial ruin, he attempts a popular novel. At this venture, he does not succeed. His wife, Amy Reardon (née Yule), cannot accept her husband's inflexibly high standards, and the resulting poverty.

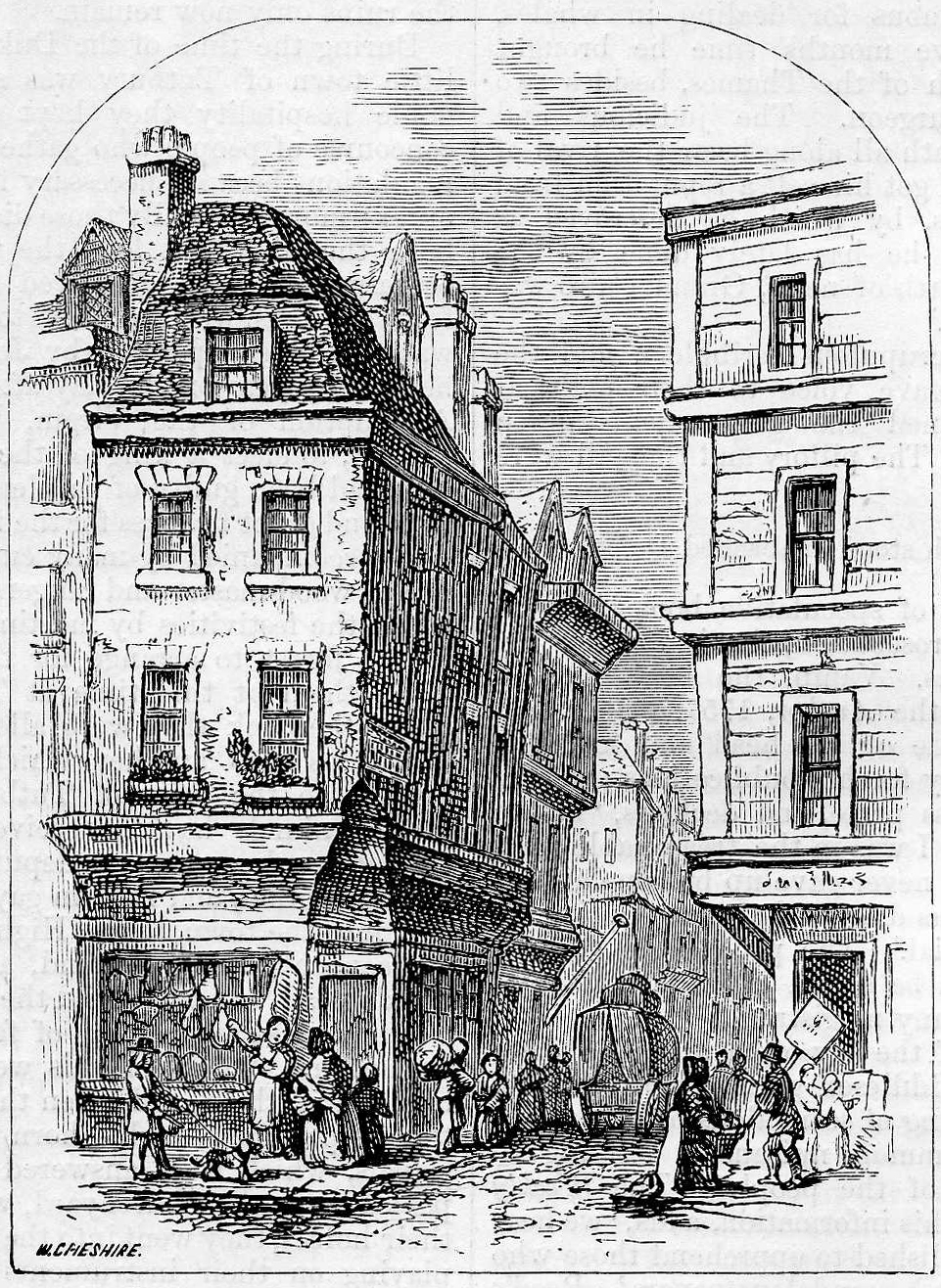
19th-century Grub Street (latterly Milton Street), as pictured in Chambers Book of Days.

The Yule family includes Amy's two uncles: John, a wealthy invalid, and Alfred, a species of critic—and Alfred's daughter, and research assistant, Marian. The friendship that develops between Marian and Milvain's sisters, who move to London following their mother's death, provides opportunity for the former to meet and fall in love with Milvain. However much Milvain respects Marian's intellectual capabilities and strength of personality, the crucial element (according to him) for marriage is missing: money. Milvain slights romantic love as a key to marriage:

As a rule, marriage is the result of a mild preference, encouraged by circumstances, and deliberately heightened into strong sexual feeling. You, of all men, know well enough that the same kind of feeling could be produced for almost any woman who wasn't repulsive.

A new motivation for Milvain manifests itself in the form of a legacy of £5,000 left to Marian by John Yule.

Life and death eventually end the possibility of this union. Milvain's initial career advancement is a position on The Current, a paper edited by Clement Fadge. Twenty years earlier, Fadge slighted Alfred Yule in a newspaper article, and Alfred Yule's resulting acerbic resentment has extended even to Milvain. Alfred refuses to countenance Marian's marriage; but his objection proves to be an obstacle to Milvain only after Yule's eyesight fails and Marian's legacy is reduced to a mere £1,500. As a result, Marian must work to provide for her parent, and her inheritance is no longer available to Milvain.

By this time, Milvain already has detected a more desirable target for marriage: Amy Reardon. Reardon's poverty and natural disposition toward ill-health culminate in his death following a brief reconciliation with his wife. She, besides the receipt of £10,000 upon John Yule's death, has the natural beauty and grace to benefit a man in the social events beneficial to his career. Amy and Milvain ultimately marry.

== Characters ==
- Jasper Milvain — a journalist who prioritises financial gain and social prominence over artistic integrity. After a broken engagement with Marian Yule, Milvain marries her cousin (and Edwin Reardon's widow), Amy, who received a legacy of £10,000 on her uncle's death. By the novel's end, Milvain secures an editorship of a periodical "The Current" partly due to determination, partly due to largesse made possible by his wife's inheritance.
- Edwin Reardon — a talented, but weak-willed writer of uncommercial novels who suffers from writer's block. A modicum of early critical praise is disappointed after his marriage to Amy Yule (and fathering of Willie), when Reardon is unable to provide for his family through his chosen profession. After Reardon fails, he takes refuge in the steady income of a clerkship proffered by a friend. Reardon is deserted by his wife, who cannot endure poverty and social degradation. They are briefly reconciled when their child becomes ill and dies; but Reardon, whose health has been broken by depression and poor living, is himself seriously ill, and his death soon follows.
- Amy Reardon – wife of Edwin Reardon, daughter of Edmund Yule, niece of Alfred Yule, and cousin of Marian Yule. Amy married Edwin after he enjoyed success with his novel On Neutral Ground, and the couple have had a son, Willie. However, she has become increasingly disillusioned with and exasperated at Edwin at his failure to produce subsequent novels and his continual inactivity. weakness, and passivity with respect to new writing.
- Alfred Yule — writer. Yule is a vehement foe of Clement Fadge, the editor who provided Milvain's first opportunity. His frustrations over meagre financial prospects and a stalled career are repeatedly visited on his wife whose lower-class background and limited education are a continual source of irritation. He dies blind.
- Marian Yule — cousin of Amy Reardon and daughter of Alfred Yule. A sympathetic portrait of a woman torn between family ties, the possibility of marriage, and the need to earn a living. Loyal to her fiancee Jasper Milvain, she ultimately is forced to acknowledge that he is not prepared to marry her after her financial circumstances have been reduced, and indeed does not even love her. She breaks off the engagement, despite still being in love with him.
- Harold Biffen — habitually (almost contentedly) down-and-out friend of Reardon. Biffen scrapes an existence from tutoring. The novel that he has worked on for many years, Mr Bailey, Grocer, is eventually published, but attracts little notice. He runs out of money and is unwilling to ask his brother for more. He develops an unrequited infatuation with Amy Reardon. Under the strain of this limerence, he commits suicide.
- Dora Milvain — Jasper Milvain's younger sister, who moves to London following her mother's death. With Jasper's encouragement, Dora enters onto a career writing for children and encounters early success. Eventually, she marries Mr. Whelpdale.
- Maud Milvain — Jasper Milvain's sister, who also moves to London following her mother's death. Begins writing as well, but is not as ambitious as her sister. She marries the wealthy Mr. Dolomore.
- Mr. Whelpdale — friend of Milvain and future husband of Dora Milvain. Whelpdale is a compulsive lover with four broken engagements behind him (in each, the woman's choice). Having abandoned fiction-writing, Whelpdale concentrates on a business assisting clients in publishing and revising novels. Eventually, his business finds commercial backing. The character of Whelpdale is based on Lord Northcliffe. At the time of writing, Northcliffe published a few inexpensive weekly papers, most notably Answers — he would later go on to become the preeminent figure in Edwardian popular journalism.

== Discussion and analysis ==
Robert L. Selig has discussed running themes of alienation and the motif of money in the novel. José Mª Díaz Lage has discussed the different characters and their particular literary production modes in the era's historical context. Stephen E. Severn has posited on how culturally conservative thinking informs the ultimate fates of various characters in the narrative. Richard Menke has analysed the historical undercurrent of the transition of the paper industry from rag paper to larger-scale paper production from wood pulp and harvested esparto grass, with consequent environmental destruction. Michael Collie has analysed Gissing's changes to the novel for the eventual French translation.

== Publication history ==
- 1891, UK, Smith, Elder (OCLC 1851102), hardback (3 volume first edition)
- 1904, USA, Brewster (OCLC 1690261), hardback (1 volume)
- 2002, New York, Modern Library (ISBN 0-375-76110-1), paperback
- 2009, New Grub Street: The 1901 Revised Text, edited by Paul Delany. Victoria: ELS Editions (ISBN 978-155058384-7)

== Legacy ==
The BBC Radio 4 sitcom Ed Reardon's Week contains characters named after, and loosely inspired by, those in the novel.

== Sources ==
- Hansen, Harry (1926). "Introduction" to New Grub Street. New York: The Modern Library, pp. v–xii.
- Goldring, Douglas (1920). "An Outburst on Gissing." In: Reputations. London: Chapman & Hall, pp. 125–132.
- Hicks, Granville (1939). "The Changing Novel." In: Figures in Transition. New York: The Macmillan Company, pp. 179–203.
- Lang, Andrew (1891). "Realism in New Grub Street," The Author, Vol. II, pp. 43–44.
- Packer, George (13 October 1991). "The Struggling Writer: Gissing Had It Right". New York Times.
- Thomas, J.D. (1953). "The Public Purposes of George Gissing," Nineteenth-Century Fiction, Vol. VIII, No. 2, pp. 118–123.
