= Algernon Gissing =

English novelist

Algernon Fred Gissing (25 November 1860 – 5 February 1937) was an English novelist and the younger brother of George Gissing. He wrote 25 novels, two collections of short stories and several pieces of travel writing. He died from heart disease.

== Biography ==
Gissing was born in Wakefield, West Riding of Yorkshire. His parents were Thomas Waller Gissing (1829–1870) and Margaret Gissing (1832–1913), and he had two older brothers named William and George. His initial education was at Back Lane School in Wakefield, but from 1870 he started attending Lindow Grove School in Cheshire as a boarder, as a result of his father's death. He went on to study Law at London University, graduating with an LLB in 1882. He practised as a solicitor in Wakefield for a while, but failed to attract enough clients to sustain his practise.

On 8 September 1887, Gissing married Catherine née Baseley (1859–1937), later moving with her to Broadway, Worcestershire. Together they had five children.

Having been unsuccessful in his legal career, Gissing decided to pursue an interest in writing literature. During his life, he wrote and published 30 books, but earned a negligible income from them. He received a number of grants from the Royal Literary Fund.

Gissing's 1924 Cotswold walking guide, The Footpath Way in Gloucestershire was one of the first for the district.

== Published works ==
Novels

- Joy Cometh in the Morning (1888)
- Both of This Parish (1889)
- A Village Hampden (1890)
- A Moorland Idyl (1891)
- A Masquerader (1892)
- Between Two Opinions (1893)
- A Vagabond in Arts (1894)
- At Society's Expense (1894)
- The Sport of Stars (1896)
- The Scholar of Bygate (1897); 2nd edition (1898)
- A Secret of the North Sea (1899)
- The Wealth of Mallerstang (1901)
- The Keys of the House (1902)
- Knitters in the Sun (1903)
- An Angel's Portion (1903)
- Arrows of Fortune (1904)
- Baliol Garth (1905)
- The Master of Pinsmead (1906)
- The Dreams of Simon Usher (1907)
- Second Selves (1908)
- The Unlit Lamp (1909)
- The Herdsman (1910)
- Rosanne (1910)
- One Ash (1911)
- The Top Farm (1912)
- A Dinner of Herbs (1913)

Short story collections

- Love in the Byways (1910)

Travel writing

- Broadway (in Dent's Temple Topographies) (1904)
- Ludlow and Stokes (1905)
- The Footpath-way in Gloucestershire (1924)

Other

- The Letters of George Gissing to Members of His Family (1927) – co-editor with sister Ellen
