= Peter and Alexis =

Book by Dmitri Merezjkovski

- Author: Dmitry Merezhkovsky
- Original title: Пётр и Алексей
- Language: Russian
- Publication date: 1904
- Publication place: Russian Empire
- Media type: Print (Paperback & Hardback)
- Preceded by: The Romance of Leonardo da Vinci

Peter and Alexis (Russian: Пётр и Алексей) is a novel by Dmitry Merezhkovsky, written in 1903–1904 and first published in Nos. 1–5, 9–12, 1904, Novy Put magazine. The third and final part of the Christ and Antichrist trilogy, it came out as a separate edition 1905, to be reissued in 1922 in Berlin, with its predecessors, The Death of the Gods and The Romance of Leonardo da Vinci, under one cover. All three novels had considerable success in Western Europe but were received coolly in Russia where the majority of the critics considered the trilogy 'tendentious' and 'scholastic'.

== Concept ==
The author sees Russia as an 'heir' to the fundamental Christ-Antichrist conflict and focuses here on Peter the Great as the "embodiment of Antichrist" (an idea he shared with Russian Old Believers) as opposed to the 'purely Christian' figure of Tsarevich Alexei.
