= Nathan Altman =

Russian painter (1889–1970)

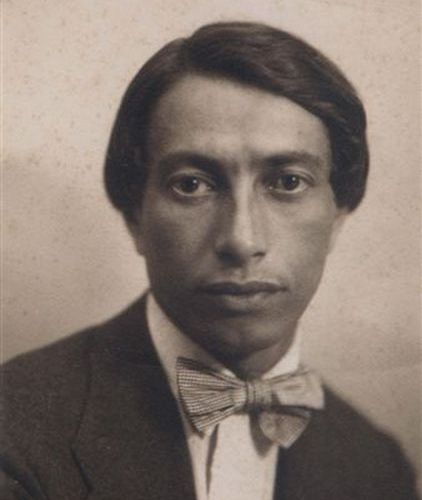
- Self-portrait, 1911.
- Born: Натан Ісайович Альтман; 10 December 1889; Vinnytsia, Ukraine
- Died: 12 December 1970 (aged 81); Leningrad, USSR
- Education: Odesa Art School
- Known for: Painting, Stage design, Illustrations
- Notable work: Portrait of Anna Akhmatova, 1914.
- Style: Cubo-Futurism, Constructivism
- Movement: Avant garde

Nathan Isaevich Altman (Russian: Натан Исаевич Альтман, romanized: Natan Isayevich Altman) (1889–1970) was a Ukraine-born artist, known for his avant-garde contributions to painting, sculpture, illustration, caricature, cartoons, stage design, and Jewish graphic art. In Paris, he joined the burgeoning Russian avant-garde group Soyuz Molodyozhi with artists Kazimir Malevich, David Burliuk, and Marc Chagall, known for pioneering Suprematism, Russian Futurism, and an often thematically Jewish mix of Fauvist and Cubist-inflected Expressionism, respectively. These influences informed Altman's work, which combined Cubo-Futurist and Constructivist elements, especially the former in his 1914 painting: Portrait of Anna Akhmatova.

For about a decade, Altman rivaled Chagall in the Russian Jewish art renaissance. In 1911, he painted Evreiskie pokhorony (Jewish Funeral) to acclaim. In 1916, he founded the Jewish Society for the Encouragement of the Arts. From 1918–24, he began designing sets, which led him to the Moscow State Yiddish Theatre. In 1923, he published his first book of Jewish graphic art for the limited edition Evreiskaia Grafika. In 1925, he served as production designer for the 100-minute silent film Jewish Luck, filmed in Altman's hometown, was based on the writing of Sholem Aleichem and Isaac Babel.

== Career ==
A student at Odessa Art School between 1902 and 1907, Altman trained in painting and sculpture, and held his first exhibition locally in 1906. He spent 1910 in Paris, where he studied at the Free Russian Academy in Paris, working in the studio of Wladimir Baranoff-Rossine. In 1910, he became a member of the group Soyuz Molodyozhi (Union of Youth) alongside Marc Chagall, Alexander Archipenko, and David Shterenberg, and befriended Jewish intellectuals such as Chaim Nachman Bialik.

In 1918, he was the member of the Board for Artistic Matters within the Department of Fine Arts of the People's Commissariat of Enlightenment together with Malevich, Baranoff-Rossine and Shevchenko. In the same year he had an exhibition with the group Jewish Society for the Furthering of the Arts in Moscow, together with Wladimir Baranoff-Rossine, El Lissitzky and the others. In this same year, he installed a temporary work of architectural sculpture in Palace Square to commemorate the 1st anniversary of the October Revolution. The canvas was subsequently cut up and used for soldiers' foot bindings.

In 1920, he became a member of the Institute for Artistic Culture (INKHUK), together with Kasimir Malevich, Vladimir Tatlin and the others. In the same year, he participated in the exhibition From Impressionism to Cubism in the Museum of Painterly Culture in Petrograd, Soviet Union (now Saint Petersburg, Russia). In 1921, he moved to Moscow. From 1921 to 1922 he was director of the Museum of Painterly Culture in Petrograd.

From 1920 to 1928, he worked on stage designs for the Habimah Theatre and the Jewish State Theatre in Moscow. In 1923, a volume of his Jewish graphic art, Evrejskaja grafika Natana Al'tmana: Tekst Maksa Osborna [Max Osborn], was published in Berlin. In 1924, he designed the sets for the film Jewish Luck.

In 1925, he participated in Exposition Internationale des Arts Decoratifs et Industriels Modernes (Art Deco) in Paris together with Aleksandra Ekster, Vadim Meller, Rudolf Frentz, Sonia Delaunay-Terk and David Shterenberg. His first solo exhibition in Leningrad, Soviet Union (now Saint Petersburg, Russia) was in 1926.

Altman moved to Paris in 1928. In 1936, he returned to Leningrad. He worked mainly for the theatre, as a book illustrator, and an authoring essays about art.

From 1941 to 1944, he was evacuated to Perm and Novosibirsk.

Nathan Altman passed away in Leningrad on December 12, 1970, and was buried in the Komarovo Cemetery (the settlement of Komarovo).

== Gallery ==
(Selection was limited by availability.)

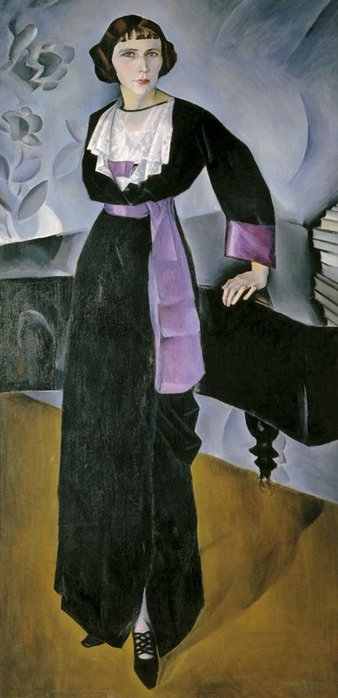
Woman at the Piano (1914)

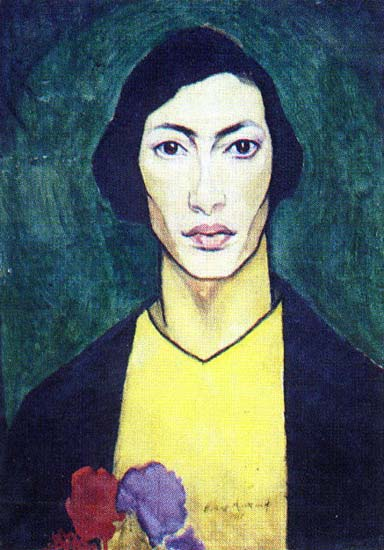
Self portrait, 1911.

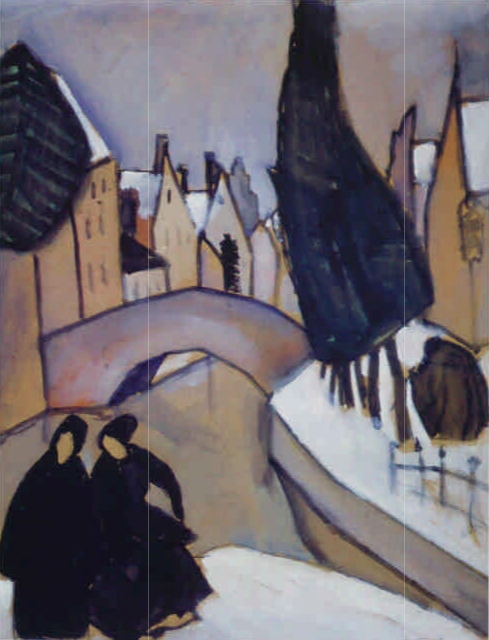
Canal (Bruges), 1911.

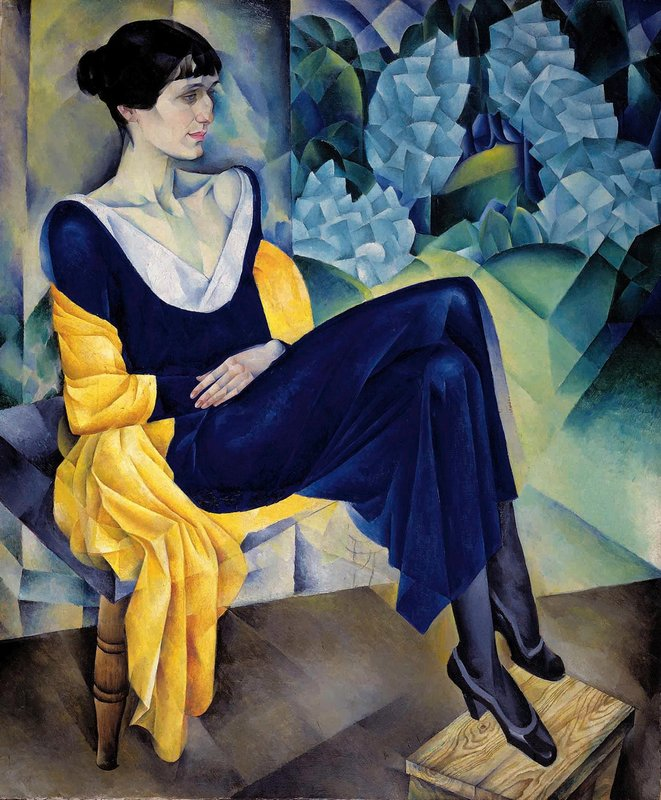
Portrait of Anna Akhmatova, 1914.

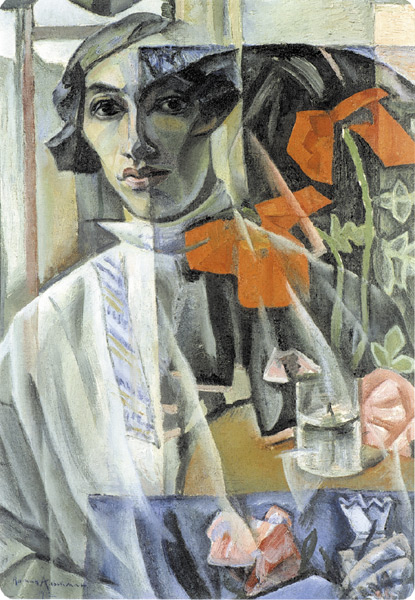
Self portrait, 1912.

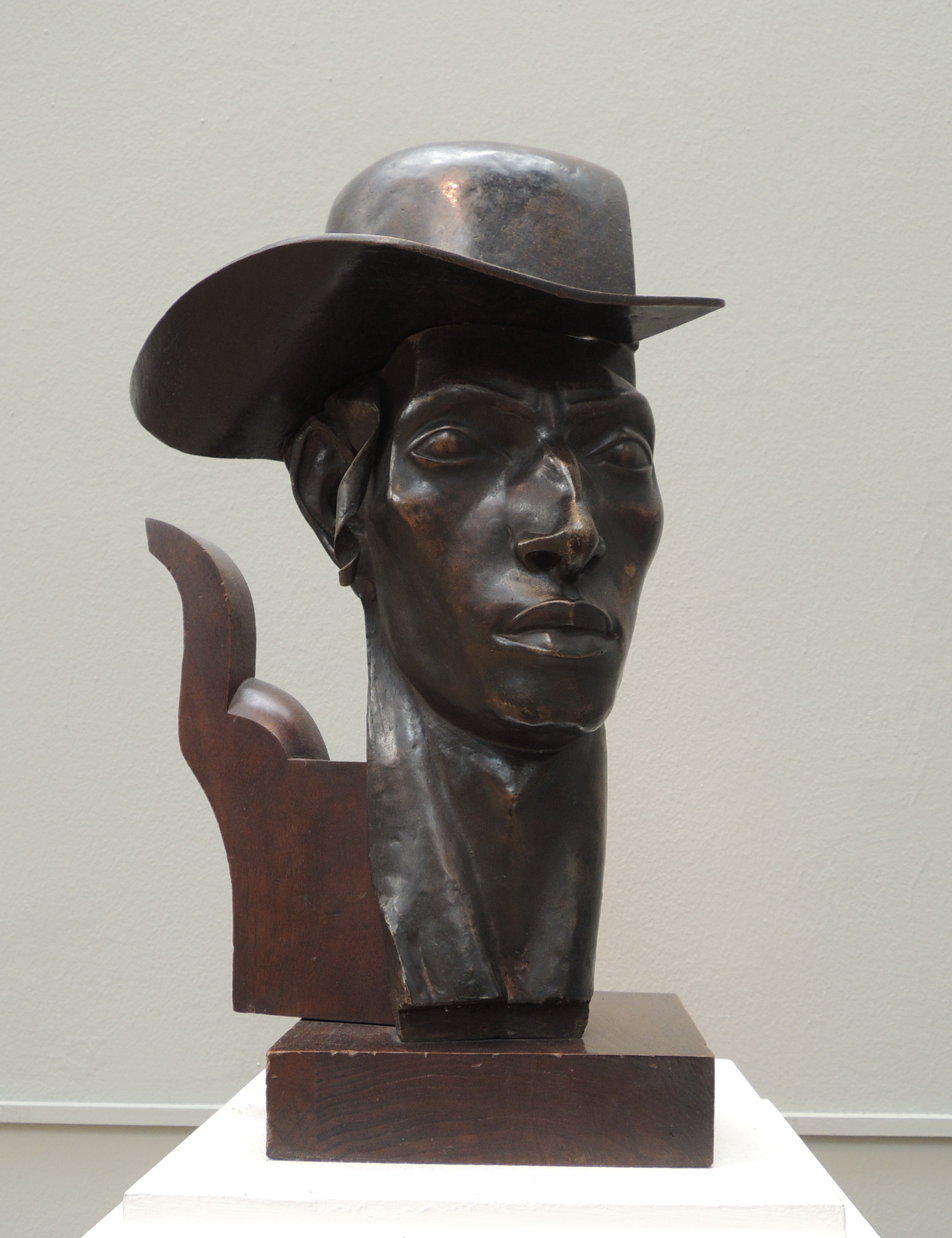
Head of a Young Jew, 1916.

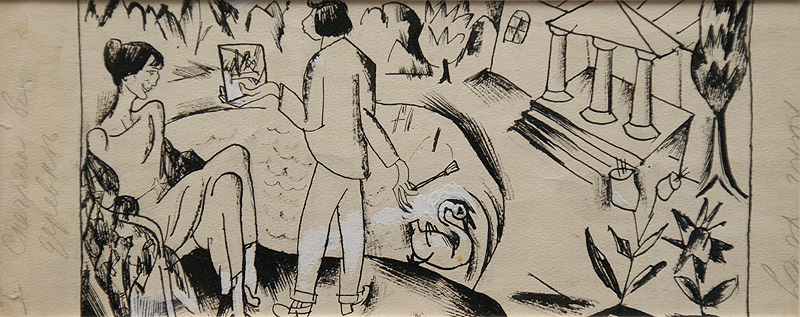
Akhmatova, 1914.

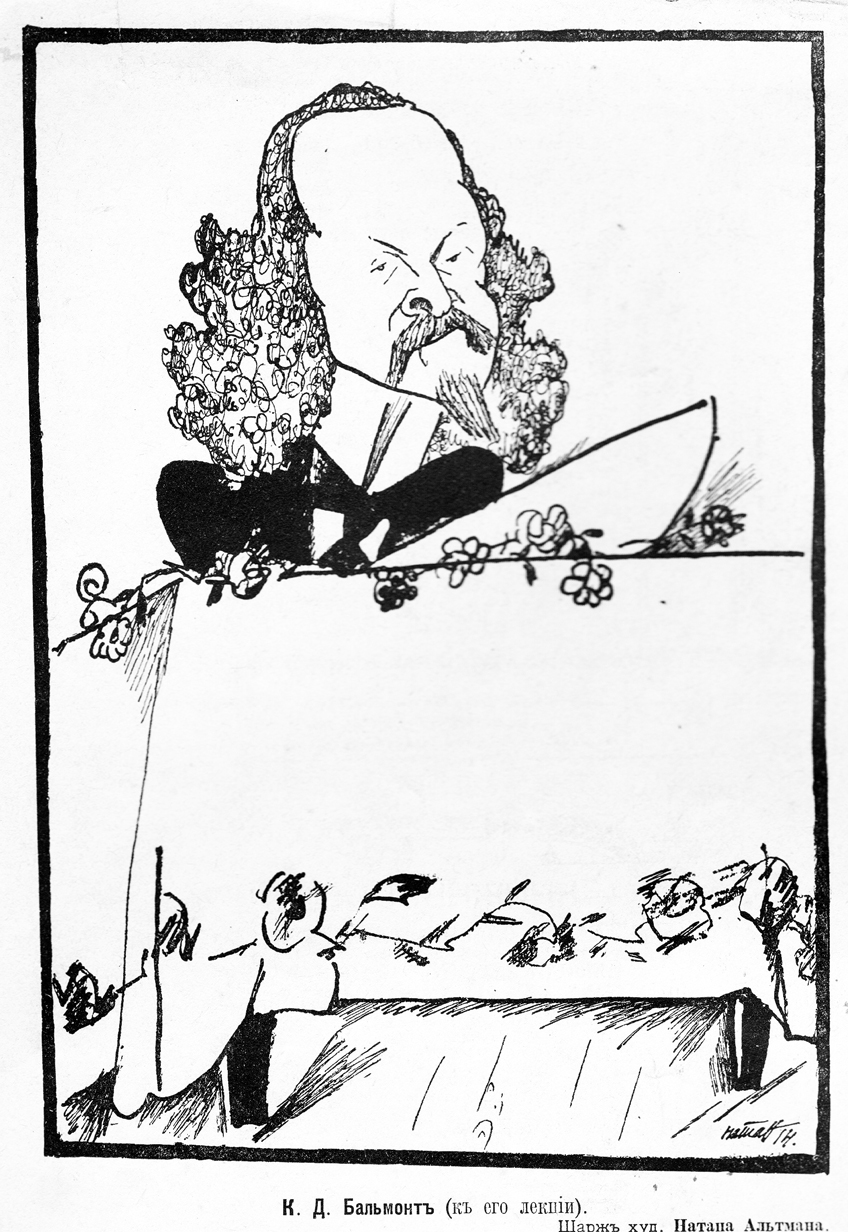
Balmont, 1914.

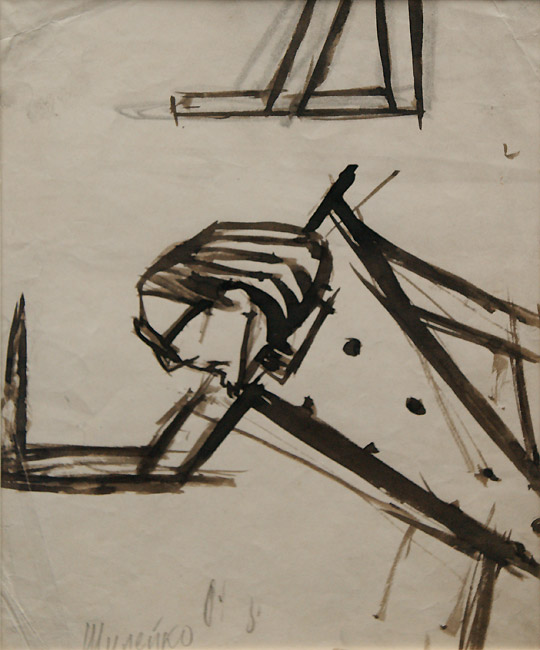
V. Shileyko, ca. 1910.

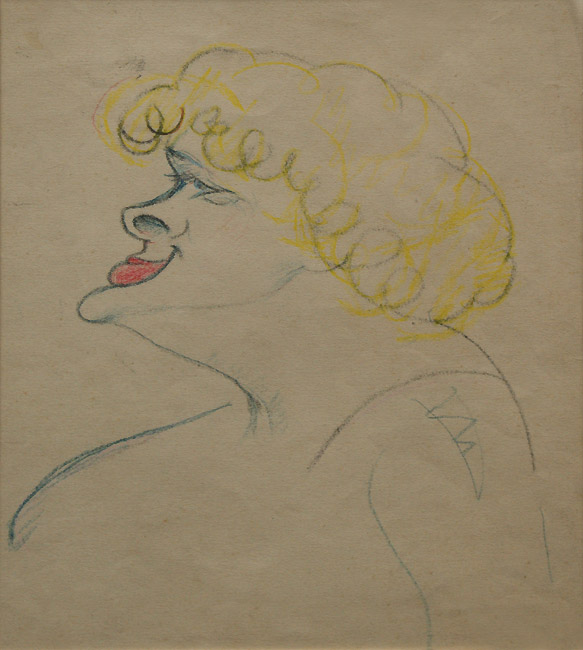
Teffi, ca. 1910.

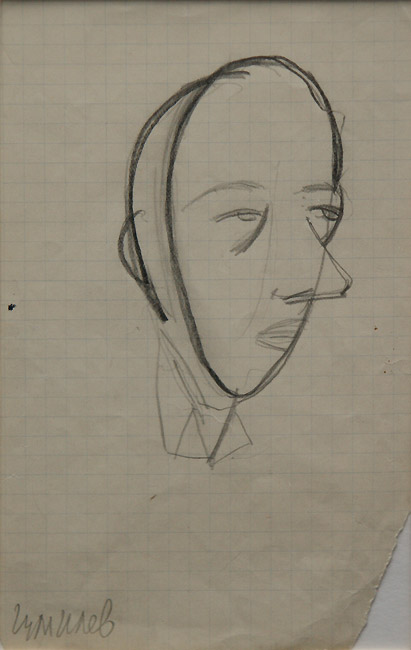
N. Gumilev, ca. 1910.

== Personal life ==
Born to a family of Jewish merchants, Altman studied in a religious Jewish school (cheder) during elementary school before attending art school in Odesa Upon graduation, he moved to Paris. Two years later, he moved to St. Petersburg. Married twice, Altman's first wife was dancer Irina Dega, and his second was Irina Scheglova, the daughter of Russian author Valentin Ternavtsev. Altman died in St. Petersbury at age 81. The apartment building House of Specialists at 61-1 Lesnoy Prospekt features a commemorative plaque in honour of the artist.

== Works ==
- Lady with a Dog. Portrait of Esther Schwartzmann. 1911. Oil on canvas mounted on cardboard. 67.5 x 47.5 cm. The Russian Museum, St. Petersburg, Russia.
- Jug and Tomatoes. 1912. Oil on canvas. 69.5 x 49.5 cm. The Russian Museum, St. Petersburg, Russia.
- Portrait of Anna Akhmatova. 1914. Oil on canvas. 123.5 x 103.2 cm. The Russian Museum, St. Petersburg, Russia
- Portrait of a Young Jew (Self-Portrait). 1916. Plaster of Paris, copper, wood. The Russian Museum, St. Petersburg, Russia. (Sculpture)
- Still Life. Colored Bottles and Planes. 1918. Oil and plaster on canvas. 59.5 x 43.5 cm. The Russian Museum, St. Petersburg, Russia.
- Material Painting. Still Life with a White Jug. 1919. Oil and enamel on canvas. 84.5 x 62 cm. The Russian Museum, St. Petersburg, Russia.
- Composition with Material Objects. 1920. Oil, enamel, glue, plaster and sawdust on canvas. 83 x 65.5 (oval). The Russian Museum, St. Petersburg, Russia.
- Self-Portrait. 1926. Lead pencil on paper. 44.6 x 35.9 cm. The Tretyakov Gallery, Moscow, Russia.
- Square in a Provincial Town. 1926. Italian and lead pencil on paper. 51.2 x 36.6 cm. The Tretyakov Gallery, Moscow, Russia.
- Still Life. Mixed technique on paper. 62.5 x 47 cm. The Museum of Russian Art. Erevan, Armenia.

== See also ==
- Fine Art of Leningrad
