= Dmitry Merezhkovsky =

Russian novelist (1866–1941)

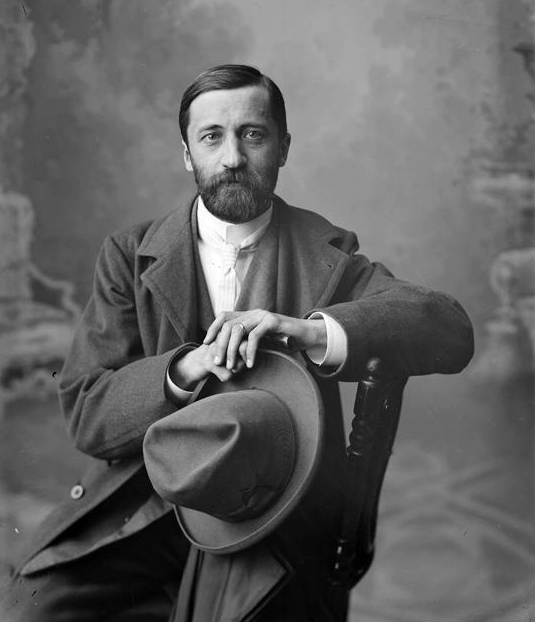
- Merezhkovsky c. 1900
- Born: Dmitry Sergeyevich Merezhkovsky; 14 August [O.S. 2 August] 1865; St Petersburg, Russian Empire
- Died: 9 December 1941 (aged 76); Paris, Nazi-occupied France
- Education: Saint Petersburg State University
- Occupations: Poet; writer; literary critic
- Spouse: Zinaida Gippius
- Relatives: Konstantin Mereschkowski
- Writing career
- Period: 1888–1941
- Genres: Poetry, historical novel, philosophical essay
- Notable works: Christ and Antichrist (trilogy)
- Movement: Russian symbolism

Dmitry Sergeyevich Merezhkovsky (Russian: Дми́трий Серге́евич Мережко́вский, IPA: [ˈdmʲitrʲɪj sʲɪrˈɡʲejɪvʲɪtɕ mʲɪrʲɪˈʂkofskʲɪj]; 14 August [O.S. 2 August] 1865 – 9 December 1941) was a Russian novelist, poet, religious thinker, and literary critic. A seminal figure of the Silver Age of Russian Poetry, regarded as a co-founder of the Symbolist movement, Merezhkovsky – with his wife, the poet Zinaida Gippius – was twice forced into political exile. During his second exile (1918–1941), he continued publishing successful novels and gained recognition as a critic of the Soviet Union. Known both as a self-styled religious prophet with his own slant on apocalyptic Christianity, and as the author of philosophical historical novels which combined fervent idealism with literary innovation, Merezhkovsky was nominated nine times for the Nobel Prize in Literature, which he came closest to winning in 1933. However, due to contested claims that he expressed regard for Fascism as a lesser evil than Communism during the outbreak of war between Germany and the USSR shortly prior to his death, his work largely fell into neglect after World War II

== Biography ==
Dmitry Sergeyevich Merezhkovsky was born on 14 August [O.S. 2 August] 1865, in Saint Petersburg, the sixth son in his family. His father, Sergey Ivanovich Merezhkovsky, served as a senior official in several Russian local governors' cabinets (including that of I.D. Talyzin in Orenburg) before entering Emperor Alexander II's court office as a Privy Councillor. His mother Varvara Vasilyevna Merezhkovskaya (née Chesnokova) was a daughter of a senior Saint Petersburg security official. Fond of arts and literature, she was what Dmitry Merezhkovsky later remembered as the guiding light of his rather lonely childhood (despite the presence of his five brothers and three sisters). There were only three people Merezhkovsky had any affinity with in his whole lifetime, and his mother, a woman "of rare beauty and angelic nature" according to biographer Yuri Zobnin, was the first and the most important of those.

=== Early years ===
Dmitry Merezhkovsky spent his early years on the Yelagin Island in Saint Petersburg, in a palace-like cottage which served as a summer dacha for the family. In the city the family occupied an old house facing the Summer Gardens, near Prachechny Bridge. The Merezhkovskys also owned a large estate in Crimea, near a road leading to the Uchan-Su waterfall. "Fabulous Oreanda palace, now in ruins, will stay with me forever. White marble pylons against the blue sea... for me it's a timeless symbol of Ancient Greece," Merezhkovsky wrote years later. Sergey Merezhkovsky, although a man of means, led an ascetic life, keeping his household 'lean and thrifty'. He saw this also as 'moral prophylactics' for his children, regarding luxury-seeking and reckless spending as the two deadliest sins. The parents traveled a lot, and an old German housekeeper, Amalia Khristianovna, spent much time with the children, amusing them with Russian fairytales and Biblical stories. It was her recounting of saints' lives that helped Dmitry to develop fervent religious feelings in his early teens.

In 1876 Dmitry Merezhkovsky joined an élite grammar school, the St. Petersburg Third Classic Gymnasium. His years spent there he described later in one word, "murderous", remembering just one teacher as a decent person – "Kessler the Latinist; well-meaning he surely never was, but at least had a kindly look." At thirteen Dmitry started writing poetry, rather in the vein of Pushkin's "Bakhchisarai Fountain", as he later remembered. He became fascinated with the works of Molière to such an extent as to form a Molière Circle in the Gymnasium. The group had nothing political in its agenda, but still aroused the interest of the secret police. Each of its members were summoned one by one to the Third Department's headquarters by the Politzeisky Bridge to be questioned. It is believed that only Sergey Merezhkovsky's efforts prevented his son from being expelled from the school.

==== Debut ====
Much as Dmitry disliked his stiff upper-lipped, stone-faced father, later he had to give him credit for being the first one to have noticed and, in his emotionless way, appreciate his first poetic exercises. In July 1879, in Alupka, Crimea, Sergey Ivanovich introduced Dmitry to the legendary Princess Yekaterina Vorontzova, once Pushkin's sweetheart. The grand dame admired the boy's verses: she (according to a biographer) "spotted in them a must-have poetic quality: the metaphysical sensitivity of a young soul" and encouraged him to soldier on. Somewhat different was young Merezhkovsky's encounter with another luminary, Fyodor Dostoyevsky, again staged by his well-connected father. As the boy started reciting his work, nervous to the point of stuttering, the famous novelist listened rather impatiently, then said: "Poor, very poor. To write well, one has to suffer. Suffer!" – "Oh no, I'd rather he won't – either suffer, or write well!", the appalled father exclaimed. The boy left Dostoyevsky's house much frustrated by the great man's verdict. Merezhkovsky's debut publication followed the same year: the Saint Petersburg magazine Zhivopisnoe obozrenie published two of his poems, "Little Cloud" and "The Autumn Melody". A year later another poem, "Narcissus", was included in a charity compilation benefiting destitute students, edited by Pyotr Yakubovich.

In autumn 1882 Merezhkovsky attended one of the first of Semyon Nadson's public readings and, deeply impressed, wrote him a letter. Soon Nadson became Merezhkovsky's closest friend – in fact, the only one, apart from his mother. Later researchers suggested there was some mystery shared by the two young men, something to do with "fatal illness, fear of death and longing for faith as an antidote to such fear". Nadson died in 1887, Varvara Vasilyevna two years later; feeling that he had lost everything he'd ever had in this world, Merezhkovsky submerged into deep depression.

In January 1883 Otechestvennye Zapiski published two more of Merezhkovsky's poems. "Sakya Muni", the best known of his earlier works, entered popular poetry-recital compilations of the time and made the author almost famous. By 1896 Merezhkovsky was rated as "a well-known poet" by the Brockhaus and Efron Encyclopedic Dictionary. Years later, having gained fame as a novelist, he felt embarrassed by his poetry and, when compiling his first Complete series in the late 1900s, cut the poetry section down by several pieces. Nevertheless, Merezhkovsky's poems remained popular, and some major Russian composers, Rachmaninoff and Tchaikovsky among them, have set dozens of them to music.

==== University years ====
From 1884 to 1889 Merezhkovsky studied history and philology at the University of Saint Petersburg where his PhD thesis was on Montaigne. He learned several foreign languages and developed strong interests in French literature, the philosophy of positivism, and the theories of John Stuart Mill and Charles Darwin. Still, his student years were joyless. "University gave me no more than a Gymnasium did. I've never had proper – either family, or education," he wrote in his 1913 autobiography. The only lecturer he remembered fondly was the historian of literature Orest Miller, who held a domestic literature circle.

In 1884 Merezhkovsky (along with Nadson) joined the Saint Petersburg's Literary Society, on Aleksey Pleshcheyev's recommendation. The latter introduced the young poet to the family of Karl Davydov, head of the Saint Petersburg Conservatory. Davydov's wife Anna Arkadyevna Davydova became Merezhkovsky's publisher in the 1890s; their daughter Lidia (Russian: Лидия Карловна Давыдова) became his first (strong, even if fleeting) romantic interest. In Davydov's circle Merezhkovsky mixed with well-established literary figures of the time – Ivan Goncharov, Apollon Maykov, Yakov Polonsky, but also Nikolay Mikhaylovsky and Gleb Uspensky, two prominent narodniks whom he regarded later as his first real teachers.

It was under the guidance of the latter that Merezhkovsky, while still a university student, embarked upon an extensive journey through the Russian provinces where he met many people, notably religious cult leaders. He stayed for some time in the village of Chudovo where Uspensky lived, and both men spent many sleepless nights discussing things like "life's religious meaning," "a common man's cosmic vision" and "the power of the land". At the time Merezhkovsky was seriously considering leaving the capital to settle down in some far-out country place and to become a teacher.

Another big influence was Mikhaylovsky, who introduced the young man to the staff of Severny Vestnik, a literary magazine he founded with Davydova. Here Merezhkovsky met Vladimir Korolenko and Vsevolod Garshin, and later Nikolai Minsky, Konstantin Balmont and Fyodor Sologub: the future leaders of the Russian Symbolist movement. Merezhkovsky's first article for the magazine, "A Peasant in the French literature", upset his mentor: Mikhaylovsky spotted in his young protégé the "penchant for mysticism", something he himself was averse to.

In early 1888 Merezhkovsky graduated from the University and embarked upon a tour through southern Russia, starting in Odessa. In Borjomi he met 19-year-old poet Zinaida Gippius. The two fell in love and on January 18, 1889, married in Tiflis, making arguably the most prolific and influential couple in the history of Russian literature. Soon husband and wife moved into their new Saint Petersburg house, Merezkovsky's mother's wedding-present.

=== Late 1880s to early 1890s ===
Merezhkovsky's major literary debut came with the publication of Poems (1883–1887) in 1888. It brought the author into the focus of the most favourable critical attention, but – even coupled with Protopop Avvacum, a poetry epic released the same year, could not solve the young family's financial problems. Helpfully, Gippius reinvented herself as a prolific fiction-writer, producing novels and novelettes with such ease that she later struggled to remember their names. Sergey Merezhkovsky's occasional hand-outs also helped the husband and wife to keep their meagre budget afloat.

Having by this time lost interest in poetry, Dmitry Merezhkovsky developed a strong affinity to Greek drama and published translations of Aeschylus, Sophocles and Euripides in Vestnik Evropy. These translations from Ancient Greek, including his later work on Daphnis and Chloe (prose version, 1896), though largely overlooked by contemporary critics, later came to be regarded as "the pride of the Russian school of classical translation", according to biographer Yuri Zobnin.

In the late 1880s Merezhkovsky debuted as a literary critic with an essay on Anton Chekhov entitled "A Newly-born Talent Facing the Same Old Question" and published by Severny Vestnik. Having spotted in his subject's prose "the seeds of irrational, alternative truth", Merezhkovsky inadvertently put an end to his friendship with Mikhaylovsky and amused Chekhov who, in his letter to Pleshcheev, mentioned the "disturbing lack of simplicity" as the article's major fault. Merezhkovsky continued in the same vein and thus invented (in retrospect) the whole new genre of a philosophical essay as a form of critical thesis, something unheard of in Russian literature before. Merezhkovsky's biographical pieces on Pushkin, Dostoyevsky, Goncharov, Maykov, Korolenko, Pliny, and Calderon scandalized the contemporary literary establishment. Later, compiled in a volume called The Eternal Companions, these essays were pronounced modern classics, their author praised as "the subtlest and the deepest of late XIX – early XX Russian literary critics" by literary historian Arkady Dolinin. The Eternal Companions became so revered a piece of literary art in the early 1910s that the volume was officially chosen as an honorary gift for excelling grammar-school graduates.

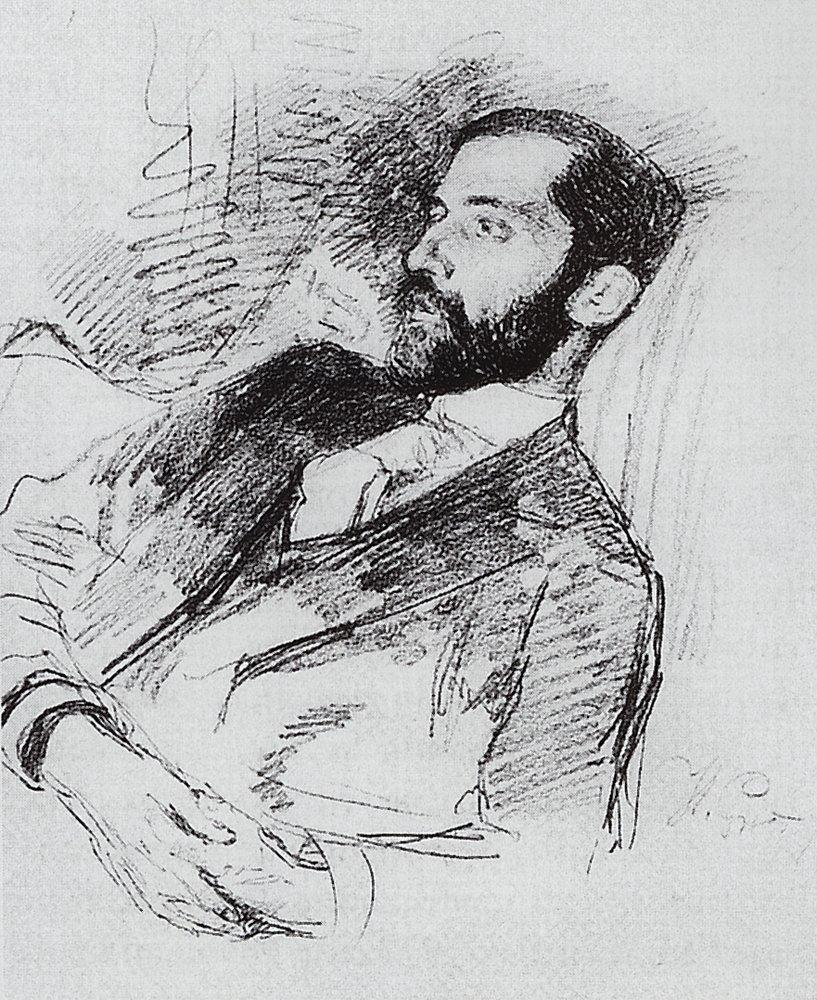
Merezhkovsky in 1890s. Portrait by Ilya Repin

In May 1890 Liubov Gurevich, the new head of the revamped Severny Vestnik, turned a former narodnik's safe haven into the exciting club for members of the rising experimental-literature scene, labeled "decadent" by detractors. Merezhkovsky's new drama Sylvio was published there, the translation of Edgar Allan Poe's "The Raven" followed suit. Other journals became interested in the young author too: Russkaya Mysl published his poem Vera (later included in his The Symbols compilation), hailed as one of Russian Symbolism's early masterpieces, its colourful mysticism providing a healthy antidote to narodniks' "reflections" of the social life. Bryusov "absolutely fell in love with it," and Pyotr Pertsov years later admitted: "For my young mind Merezhkovsky's Vera sounded so much superior to this dull and old-fashioned Pushkin".

Russkaya Mysl released The Family Idyll (Semeynaya idillia, 1890); a year later another symbolic poem, Death (Smert), appeared in Severny Vestnik. In 1891 Merezhkovsky and Gippius first travelled to Western Europe together, staying mostly in Italy and France; the poem End of the Century (Russian: Конец века. Очерки современного Парижа) inspired by the European trip, came out two years later. On their return home the couple stayed for a while in Gippius' dacha at Vyshny Volochyok; it was here that Merezhkovsky started working on his first novel, The Death of the Gods. Julian the Apostate. A year later it was finished, but by this time the situation with Severny Vestnik had changed: outraged by Akim Volynsky's intrusive editorial methods, Merezhkovsky severed ties with the magazine, at least for a while. In the late 1891 he published his translation of Sophocles' Antigone in Vestnik Evropy, part of Goethe's Faustus (in Russkoye Obozrenye) and Euripides' Hyppolite (in Vestnik Evropy again). The latter came out in 1893, after the couple's second trip to Europe where they first encountered Dmitry Filosofov. Merezhkovsky's vivid impressions of Greece and a subsequent spurt of new ideas provided the foundation for his second novel.

==== The Symbolism manifestos ====
In 1892 Merezhkovsky's second volume of poetry, entitled Symbols. Poems and Songs, came out. The book, bearing the influences of Edgar Allan Poe and Charles Baudelaire as well as the author's newly-found religious ideas, became a younger readership's favourite. Of the elder writers only Yakov Polonsky supported it wholeheartedly. In October 1892 Merezhkovsky's lecture "The Causes of the Decline of the Contemporary Russian Literature and the New Trends in it" was first read in public, then came out in print. Brushing aside the 'decadent' tag, the author argued that all three "streaks of Modern art" – "Mystic essence, Symbolic language and Impressionism" – could be traced back to the works of Lev Tolstoy or of Dostoyevsky, making Russian Modernism, therefore, a continuation of Russian literature's classic tradition. Coupled with Symbols, the lecture was widely accepted as Russian symbolism's early manifesto. The general reaction to it was mostly negative. The author found himself between two fires: liberals condemned his ideas as "the new obscurantism", members of posh literary salons treated his revelations with scorn. Only one small group of people greeted "The Causes" unanimously, and that was the staff of Severny Vestnik, which welcomed him back.

In 1893–1894 Merezhkovsky published numerous books (the play The Storm is Over and the translation of Sophocles' Oedipus the King among them), but the money all this hard work brought were scant. Now writing his second novel, he had to accept whatever work was offered to him. In the late 1893 Merezhkovskys settled in Saint Petersburg again. Here they frequented the Shakespearean Circle, the Polonsky's Fridays and the Literary Fund gatherings. Then the pair started their own home salon with Filosofov and Akim Volynsky becoming habitués. All of a sudden Merezhkovsky found that his debut novel was to be published in Severny Vestnik after all. What he didn't realise was that this came as a result of a Gippius' tumultuous secret love affair with Akim Volynsky, one of this magazine's chiefs.

=== 1895–1903 ===
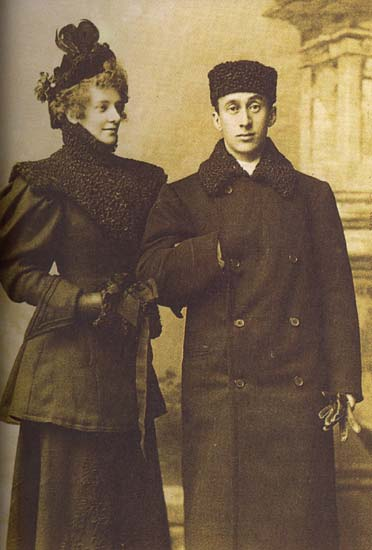
Gippius and Volynsky, 1890s

The Death of the Gods which came out in 1895 (Severny Vestnik, Nos.1–6) opened the Christ & Antichrist trilogy and in retrospect is regarded as the first Russian symbolist novel. Sceptics prevailed (most of them denouncing the author's alleged Nietzscheanity), but the allies were ecstatic. "A novel made for eternity," Bryusov marveled. Five years later Julian the Apostate was published in France, translated by Zinaida Vasilyeva.

Merezhkovsky's relationship with Severny Vestnik, though, again started to deteriorate, the reason being Akim Volynsky's jealousy. In 1896 all three of them (husband still unaware of what was going on behind his back) made a trip to Europe to visit Leonardo da Vinci's places. Several ugly rows with Volynsky finally prompted Gippius to send her scandalous-minded lover home. Volynsky reacted by expelling his ex-lover's husband from Severny Vestnik (some sources say it was the Merezhkovskys who withdraw their cooperation with the "Severny Vestnik" a year before the magazine shut down in 1898, along with Minsky and Sologub), made sure the major literary journals would shut the door on him and published (in 1900) under his own name a monograph Leonardo da Vinci, written and compiled by his adversary.

The scandal concerning plagiarism lasted for almost two years. Feeling sick and ignored, Merezhkovsky in 1897 was seriously considering leaving his country for good, being kept at home only by the lack of money. For almost three years the second novel, Resurrection of Gods. Leonardo da Vinci (The Romance of Leonardo da Vinci – in English and French) remained unpublished. It finally appeared in Autumn 1900 in Mir Bozhy under the title "The Renaissance". In retrospect these two books' "...persuasive power came from Merezhkovsky's success in catching currents then around him: strong contrasts between social life and spiritual values, fresh interest in the drama of pagan ancient Athens, and identification with general western European culture."

By the time of his second novel's release Merezhkovsky was in a different cultural camp – that of Dyagilev and his close friends – Alexandre Benois, Léon Bakst, Nikolay Minsky and Valentin Serov. Their own brand new Mir Iskusstva (World of Art) magazine, with Dmitry Filosofov as a literary editor, accepted Merezhkovsky wholeheartedly. It was here that his most famous essay, L. Tolstoy and Dostoyevsky was published in 1900–1901, coinciding with the escalation of Tolstoy's conflict with the Russian Orthodox church. Tolstoy invited the couple to his Yasnaya Polyana estate in 1904 and, to both parties' delight, the visit proved to be friendly. Behind the facade, there was little love lost between them; the old man confessed in his diary that, he just couldn't "force himself to love those two," and Merezhkovsky's critique of what he saw as "Tolstoy's nihilism" continued.

=== The God-seekers and Troyebratstvo ===
In the early 1900s Merezhkovskys formed the group called the Religious-Philosophical Meetings (1901–1903) based on the concept of the New Church which was suggested by Gippius and supposed to become an alternative to the old Orthodox doctrine, "...imperfect and prone to stagnation." The group, organized by Merezhkovsky and Gippius along with Vasily Rozanov, Viktor Mirolyubov and Valentin Ternavtsev, claimed to provide "a tribune for open discussion of questions concerning religious and cultural problems," serving to promote "neo-Christianity, social organization and whatever serves perfecting the human nature." Having lost by this time contacts with both Mir Iskusstva and Mir Bozhy, Merezhkovskys felt it was time for them to create their own magazine, as a means for "bringing the thinking religious community together." In July 1902, in association with Pyotr Pertsov and assisted by some senior officials including ministers Dmitry Sipyagin and Vyacheslav von Plehve, they opened their own Novy Put (New Path) magazine, designed as an outlet for The Meetings.

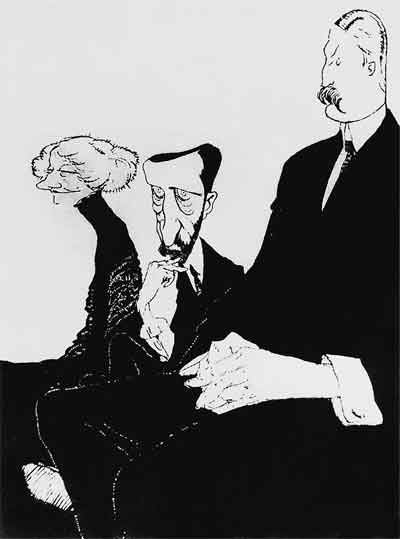
Troyebratstvo (Gippius, Merezhkovsky and Filosofov) in the early 1910s. Caricature by Re-Mi (Nikolai Remizov)

After the 22nd session, in April 1903, the Meetings of the group (by this time known as Bogoiskateli, or God-seekers) were cancelled by the procurator of the Holy Synod of the Russian Orthodox Church Konstantin Pobedonostsev's decree, the main reason being Merezhkovsky's frequent visits to places of mass sectarian settlements where God-seekers' radical ideas of Church 'renovation' were becoming popular. In Novy Put things changed too: with the arrival of strong personalities like Nikolai Berdyayev, Sergey Bulgakov and Semyon Frank the magazine solidified its position, yet drifted away from its originally declared mission. In the late 1904 Merezhkovsky and Gippius quit Novy Put, remaining on friendly terms with its new leaders and their now highly influential 'philosophy section'. In 1907 the Meetings revived under the new moniker of The Religious-Philosophical Society, Merezhkovsky once again promoting his 'Holy Ghost's Kingdom Come' ideas. This time it looked more like a literary circle than anything it had ever purported to be.

The couple formed their own domestic "church", trying to involve miriskusniks. Of the latter, only Filosofov took the idea seriously and became the third member of the so-called Troyebratstvo (The Brotherhood of Three) built loosely upon the Holy Trinity format and having to do with the obscure 12th century idea of the Third Testament. Merezhkovsky developed it into the Church of the Holy Ghost, destined to succeed older churches – first of the Father (Old Testament), then of the Son (New Testament). The services at Troyebratstvo (with the traditional Russian Orthodox elements organized into a bizarre set of rituals) were seen by many as blasphemy and divided the St. Petersburg intellectual elite: Vasily Rozanov was fascinated by the thinly veiled eroticism of the happening, Nikolai Berdyaev was among those outraged by the whole thing, as were the (gay, mostly) members of Mir Iskusstva. Sergei Diaghilev accused Filosofov of committing 'adultery'. The latter in 1905 settled down in Merezhkovskys' St. Petersburg house, becoming virtually a family member.

In 1904 Peter and Alexis, the third and final novel of Christ and Antichrist trilogy was published (in Novy Put, Nos. 1–5, 9–12), having at its focus the figure of Peter the Great as an "embodied Antichrist" – an idea the author shared with Russian raskolniki. The novel's release was now eagerly anticipated in Europe where Merezhkovsky by this time has become a best-selling author, Julian the Apostate having undergone ten editions (in four years) in France. But when The Daily Telegraph described the novelist as "an heir to Tolstoy and Dostoyevsky's legacy," back in Russia critics denounced this praise so unanimously that Merezhkovsky was forced to publicly deny having had any pretensions of this kind whatsoever.

=== 1905–1908 ===
After the Bloody Sunday of January 9, 1905, Merezhkovsky's views changed drastically, the defeat of the Imperial Russian Navy by the Imperial Japanese Navy helping him see, as he put it, "the anti-Christian nature of the Russian monarchy." The 1905 Revolution was now seen by Merezhkovsky as a prelude for some kind of a religious upheaval he thought himself to be a prophet of. The writer became an ardent supporter of the civil unrest, writing pro-revolutionary verse, organizing protest parties for students, like that in Alexandrinsky theatre. In October 1905 he greeted the government's 'freedoms-granting' decree but since then was only strengthening ties with leftist radicals, notably, esers.

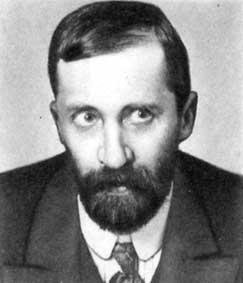

In The Forthcoming Ham (Gryadushchu Ham, 1905) Merezhkovsky explained his political stance, seeing, as usual, all things refracted into Trinities. Using the pun ("Ham" in Russian, along with a Biblical character's name, meaning 'lout', 'boor') the author described the three "faces of Ham'stvo" (son of Noah's new incarnation as kind of nasty, God-jeering scoundrel Russian): the past (Russian Orthodox Church's hypocrisy), the present (the state bureaucracy and monarchy) and the future – massive "boorish upstart rising up from society's bottom." Several years on the book was regarded as prophetic by many.

In spring 1906, Merezhkovsky and Filosofov went into a self-imposed European exile in order to promote what they termed "the new religious consciousness." In France they founded Anarchy and Theocracy magazine and released a compilation of essays called Le Tsar et la Revolution. In one of the articles he contributed to it, Revolution and Religion, Merezhkovsky wrote: "Now it's almost impossible to foresee what a deadly force this revolutionary tornado starting upwards from the society's bottom will turn out to be. The church will be crashed down and the monarchy too, but with them – what if Russia itself is to perish – if not the timeless soul of it, then its body, the state?" Again, what at the time was looked upon as dull political grotesque a decade later turned into grim reality.

In 1908 the play about "the routinous side of the revolution," Poppy Blossom (Makov Tzvet) came out, all three Troyebratstvo members credited as co-authors. It was followed by "The Last Saint" (Posledny Svyatoy), a study on Seraphim Sarovsky, this time Merezhkovsky's own work. More significant were two of his socio-political/philosophical essays, "Not Peace But Sword" and "In Still Waters". In them, working upon his concept of "the evolutionary mysticism," Merezhkovsky argued that revolution in both Russia and the rest of the world (he saw the two as closely linked: the first "steaming forward," the latter "rattling behind") was inevitable, but could succeed only if preceded by "the revolution of the human spirit," involving the Russian intelligentsia's embracing his idea of the Third Testament. Otherwise, Merezhkovsky prophesied, political revolution will bring nothing but tyranny and the "Kingdom of Ham."

Among people whom Merezhkovskys talked with in Paris were Anatole France, Rudolf Steiner, Bergson, leaders of the French Socialists. Disappointed by the general polite indifference to their ideas, husband and wife returned home in the late 1908, but not before Merezhkovsky's historical drama Pavel the First (Pavel Pervy) was published. Confiscated and then banned by the Russian aut]horities, it became the first part of the trilogy The Kingdom of the Beast (Tsarstvo zverya). Dealing with the nature and history of the Russian monarchy, the trilogy had little in common with the author's earlier symbolism-influenced prose and, cast in the humanist tradition of the 19th-century Russian literature, was seen later as marking the peak of Merezhkovsky's literary career. The second and the third parts of the trilogy, the Decembrists novels Alexander the First and December 14 came out in 1913 and 1918 respectively.

=== 1909–1913 ===
In 1909 Merezhkovsky found himself in the center of another controversy after coming out with harsh criticism of Vekhi, the volume of political and philosophical essays written and compiled by the group of influential writers, mostly his former friends and allies, who promoted their work as a manifesto, aiming to incite the inert Russian intelligentsia into the spiritual revival. Arguing against vekhovtsy's idea of bringing Orthodoxy and the Russian intellectual elite together, Merezhkovsky wrote in an open letter to Nikolay Berdyaev:

Orthodoxy is the very soul of the Russian monarchy, and monarchy is the Orthodoxy's carcass. Among things they both hold sacred are political repressions, the [ultra-nationalist] Union of Russian People, the death penalty and meddling with other countries' international affairs. How can one entrust oneself to prayers of those whose actions one sees as God-less and demonic?

Some argued Merezhkovsky's stance was inconsistent with his own ideas of some five years ago. After all, the Vekhi authors were trying to revitalize his own failed project of bringing the intellectual and the religious elites into collaboration. But the times had changed for Merezhkovsky and – following this (some argued, unacceptably scornful) anti-Vekhi tirade, his social status, too. Shunned by both former allies and the conservatives, he was hated by the Church: Saratov Bishop Dolganov even demanded his excommunication after the book Sick Russia was published in 1910. For the Social Democrats, conversely, Merezhkovsky, not a "decadent pariah" any-more, suddenly turned a "well-established Russian novelist" and the "pride of the European literature." The time had come for former friend Rozanov to write words that proved in the long run to be prophetic: "The thing is, Dmitry Sergeyevich, those whom you are with now, will never be with you. Never will you find it in yourself to wholly embrace this dumb, dull and horrible snout of the Russian revolution."

In the early 1910s Merezhkovsky moved to the left side of the Russian cultural spectrum, finding among his closest associates the esers Ilya Fondaminsky and, notably, Boris Savinkov. The latter was trying to receive from Merezhkovsky some religious and philosophical justification for his own terrorist ideology, but also had another, more down to Earth axe to grind, that of getting his first novel published. This he did, with Merezhkovsky's assistance – to strike the most unusual debut of the 1910 Russian literary season. In 1911 Merezhkovsky was officially accused of having links with terrorists. Pending trial (which included the case of Pavel Pervy play) the writer stayed in Europe, then crossed the border in 1912 only to have several chapters of Alexander the First novel confiscated. He avoided being arrested and in September, along with Pirozhkov, the publisher, was acquitted.

1913 saw Merezhkovsky involved in another public scandal, when Vasily Rozanov openly accused him of having ties with the "terrorist underground" and, as he put it, "trying to sell Motherland to Jews." Merezhkovsky suggested that the Religious and Philosophical Society should hold a trial and expel Rozanov from its ranks. The move turned to be miscalculated, the writer failing to take into account the extent of his own unpopularity within the Society. The majority of the latter declined the proposal. Rozanov, high-horsed, quit the Society on his own accord to respond stingingly by publishing Merezhkovsky's private letters so as to demonstrate the latter's hypocrisy on the matter.

=== 1914–1919 ===
==== 1914–1916 ====
For a while in 1914 it looked as though Merezhkovsky would have his first ever relatively calm year. With the two Complete Works Of editions released by the Wolfe's and Sytin's publishing houses, academic Nestor Kotlyarevsky nominated the author for the Nobel Prize for literature. Then World War I broke out (July). The Merezhkovskys expressed their skepticism of Russian involvement in the war and of the patriotic hullabaloo stirred up by some intellectuals. The writer made a conscious effort to distance himself from politics and almost succeeded, but in 1915 was in it again, becoming friends with Alexander Kerensky and joining the Maxim Gorky-led Movement of the patriotic left calling for Russia's withdrawal from the war in the most painless possible way.

Two new plays by Merezhkovsky, Joy Will Come (Radost Budet) and The Romantics were staged in war-time Petrograd theaters. The latter proved a successful hit, but for the mainstream critics its playwright remained a "controversial author". "All in all, Russian literature is as hostile to me as it has always been. I could as well be celebrating the 25th anniversary of this hostility", the author wrote in his short autobiography for Semyon Vengerov's biographical dictionary.

==== 1917: February and October ====
1917 for the Merezhkovskys started with a bout of political activity: the couple's flat on Sergiyevskaya Street looked like a secret branch of Russian Duma (that was when the seeds of a rumour concerning the couple's alleged membership in the Russian freemason community were sown). Merezhkovsky greeted the February anti-monarchy revolution and described the Kerensky-led Provisional government as "quite friendly". By the end of the spring he had become disillusioned with the government and its ineffective leader; in summer he began to speak of the government's inevitable fall and of a coming Bolshevik tyranny. Late October saw Merezhkovsky's worst expectations coming to life.

Merezhkovsky viewed the October Socialist Revolution of 1917 as a catastrophe. He saw it as the Coming of Ham he wrote about a decade later, the tragic victory for, as he choose to put it, Narod-Zver (The Beast-nation), the political and social incarnation of universal Evil, putting the whole of human civilization in danger. Merezhkovsky and Gippius tried to use whatever influence they retained upon the Bolshevist cultural leaders to ensure the release of their friends, the arrested Provisional-government ministers. Ironically, one of the first things the Soviet government did was lift the ban from Merezhkovsky's anti-monarchist Pavel Pervy play, and it was staged in several of Red Russia's theaters.

==== 1918–19 ====
For a while the Merezhkovskys' flat served as an Eser headquarters, but this came to an end in January 1918 when Vladimir Lenin dissolved the so-called Uchredilovka –the Russian Constituent Assembly. In his 1918 diary Merezhkovsky wrote:

How fragrantly fresh our February and March were, with their bluish, heavenly blizzards, what a beauty human face shone with! Where is it all now? Peering into the October crowd, one sees that it is faceless. Not the ugliness of it, but facelessness is what's most disgusting. [...] Strolling down the Petersburg streets, I recognize a Communist face at once. What frightens most in it – the self-satisfaction of a satiated beast, animalistic obtuseness? No, the most horrible in this face is its dreariness, this transcendental dreariness, found only in Paradise that's been found on Earth, the Antichrist's Kingdom Come.

In 1919, having sold everything including dishes and extra clothes, the Merezhkovskys started collaborating with Maxim Gorky's new World Literature publishing house, receiving a salary and food rations. "Russian Communists are not all of them villains. There are well-meaning, honest, crystal clear people among them. Saints, almost. These are the most horrible ones. These saints stink of the 'Chinese meat' most", Merezhkovsky wrote in his diary. (Note: Many people found it inexplicable that amidst mass hunger with no agricultural farms functioning suddenly lots of fresh veal would appear from time to time at market places, sold invariably by the Chinese. This "veal" was widely believed to be human flesh: that of the "enemies of the revolution", executed in the Cheka basements.)

After news started to filter through of the defeats suffered by the White forces of Yudenich, Kolchak and Denikin in the course of the Russian Civil War of 1917–1922, the Merezhkovskys saw their only chance of survival in fleeing Russia. They left Petrograd on December 14, 1919, along with Filosofov and Zlobin (Gippius' young secretary), having obtained from Anatoly Lunacharsky signed permission "to leave Petrograd for the purpose of reading some lectures on Ancient Egypt to Red Army fighters".

=== Merezhkovsky in exile ===
Merezkovsky, Gippius, Filosofov and Zlobin headed first for Minsk, then Vilno, staying in both cities to give newspaper interviews and public lectures. Speaking to a Vilno correspondent, Merezhkovsky commented:

The whole question of Russia's existence as such – and it's non-existent at the moment, as far as I am concerned, – depends on Europe's recognizing at last the true nature of Bolshevism. Europe has to open its eyes to the fact that Bolshevism uses the Socialist banner only as a camouflage; that what it does in effect is defile high Socialist ideals; that it is a global threat, not just local Russian disease. ...There is not a trace in Russia at the moment of either Socialism or even the [proclaimed] dictatorship of proletariat; the only dictatorship that's there is that of the two people: Lenin and Trotsky.

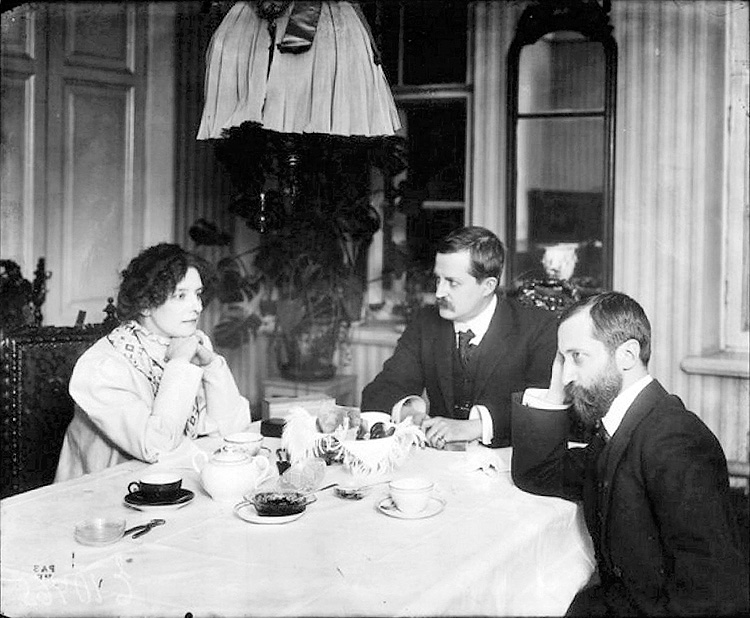
Gippius, Filosofov and Merezhkovsky. Warsaw, 1920

In Warsaw Merezhkovsky did practical work for some Russian immigrant organizations, Gippius edited the literary section in Svoboda newspaper. Both were regarding Poland as a "messianic", potentially unifying place and a crucial barrier in the face of the spreading Bolshevist plague. In the summer of 1920 Boris Savinkov arrived into the country to have talks with Józef Piłsudski: he engaged Merezhkovsky and Filosofov in the activities of the so-called Russian Evacuation committee (more of a White Army mobilization center) and introduced the writer to Piłsudski. On behalf of the Committee Merezhkovsky issued a memorandum calling the peoples of Russia to stop fighting the Polish army and join its ranks. The whole thing flopped, though, as Poland and Russia reached the armistice agreement. Merezhkovskys and Zlobin left for France, Filosofov staying in Warsaw to head the Savinkov-led Russian National committee's anti-Bolshevik propaganda department.

In Paris Merezhkovsky founded the Religious Union (later Soyuz Neprimirimykh, the Union of the Unpacified), was holding lectures, contributed to Pavel Milyukov's Poslednye Novosty and Pyotr Struve's Osvobozhdenye newspapers, exposing what he saw as the Bolshevist lies and denouncing the "Kingdom of Antichrist." It was becoming more and more obvious, though, that Merezhkovsky, backed only by the circle of friends, was in isolation, misunderstood by some, abhorred by others. His calling for the international intervention into Russia angered the left; rejecting the restoration of the Russian monarchy antagonized the right. His single ally at the time was Ivan Bunin; never sharing much personal affinity, the two men formed an alliance in their relentless anti-Soviet campaign. Besides, having maintained strong contacts with influential French politics lobbying the interests of the Russian immigrants, both ensured that the Russian writers should get some financial support from the French government. A couple of years later another sponsor was found in Tomáš Masaryk who granted personal pensions to some prominent figures in the immigrant Russian writers' community.

Merezhkovsky insisted upon severing all the International PEN's contacts with Communist Russia and cancelling French help for the victims of mass hunger in Russian Volga Region arguing, not unreasonably, that those in need will not ever see any of the money or food sent. He criticised the exiled Russian Constituent Assembly's communique which was, in his opinion, too conciliatory in tone. In 1922 the collection of articles and essays of the four authors (Merezhkovsky, Gippius, Filosofov contacts with whom have been restored, and Zlobin) came out under the title The Kingdom of Antichrist, the general idea of the book being that the 'Russian fires', globalist in their nature and intent, promise "either brotherhood in slavery or the end in a common grave" for the European nations.

In winter 1925 a small literary and philosophy circle was formed by Merezhkovsky and Gippius; two years later it was officially launched as the Green Lamp group. With the Novy Korabl (The New Ship) magazine of its own, the group attracted the whole of the Russian intellectual elite in exile and remained the important cultural center for the next ten years. "We are the Criticism of Russia as such, the latter's disembodied Thought and Conscience, free to judge its present and foresee its future," wrote Merezhkovsky of the Green Lamp mission.

In 1928 at the First Congress of Russian writers in exile held in Belgrade, King Alexander I of Yugoslavia bestowed on Merezhkovsky the Order of Savva of the 1st Degree merited by his services for world culture. A series of lectures organised for Merezhkovsky and Gippius by the Serbian Academy signalled the launch of the Yugoslav-based "Russian Library" series, where the best works of Bunin, Merezhkovsky, Gippius, Alexander Kuprin, Aleksey Remizov, Konstantin Balmont, Ivan Shmelyov and Igor Severyanin came out over the next several years. Things started to deteriorate in the early 1930s; with the Czech and the French grants withdrawn and much feared Socialists rising high on the French political scene, Merezhkovskys looked southwards and found there a sympathizer in Benito Mussolini who took great interest in the work and views of a Russian writer, now a multiple Nobel Prize for literature nominee.

==== Merezhkovsky's literary activities: 1925–41 ====
In the mid-1920s, disappointed by the Western cultural elite's reaction to his political manifestos, Merezhkovsky returned to religious and philosophical essays, but in the new format, that of a monumental free-form experimental-styled treatise. Some of his new books were biographies, some just extensive, amorphous researches in ancient history. Speaking of the first two of them, The Birth of Gods. Tutankhamen in Crete (1925) and Messiah (1928), Merezhkovsky thus explained his credo: "Many people think I am a historical novelist, which is wrong. What I use the Past for is only searching for the Future. The Present is a kind of exile to me. My true home is the Past/Future, which is where I belong."

Of the three fundamental books Merezhkovsky created in the late 1920s early 1930s another trilogy took shape, loosely linked by the concept of man's possible way to salvation. The Mystery of the Three: Egypt and Babylon (Prague, 1925) was followed by the Mystery of the West: Atlantis-Europe (Berlin, 1930), where the cherished Third Testament idea took an apocalyptic, Nietzschean turn. The third, Unfamiliar Jesus (1932, Belgrade), is seen in retrospect as the strongest of the three.

All of a sudden Merezhkovsky, a prolific writer again, drifted into the focus of the Nobel Prize committee attention. From 1930 onwards Sigurd Agrell, professor of Slavic languages in Lund University, started to methodically nominate Merezhkovsky for the Prize, although, invariably (and rather frustratingly for both), in tandem with Ivan Bunin. In November 1932 Gippius in a letter to Vera Bunina expressed her opinion that Merezhkovsky had no chance of winning "because of his anti-Communist stance," but the truth was, Bunin (no lesser a Communism-loather than his rival) wrote books that were more accessible and, generally, popular. Merezkovsky even suggested they should make a pact and divide the money should one of them ever win, but Bunin took seriously what was meant apparently as a joke and responded with outright refusal. He won the Prize in 1933.

Agrell continued nominating Merezhkovsky up until his own death in 1937 (making eight such nominations, in all), but each year the latter's chances were getting slimmer. The books he produced in his latter years (like the compilation of religious biographies Faces of Saints: from Jesus to Nowadays and The Reformers trilogy, published posthumously) were not ground-breaking. Hard times and deepening troubles notwithstanding, Merezhkovsky continued to work hard until his dying day, trying desperately to complete his Spanish Mysteries trilogy; the last of the three pieces, the unfinished Little Theresa, was with him at his deathbed; he died literally with a pen in his hand.

==== Merezhkovsky and the European dictators ====
Although never a Russian nationalist, Merezhkovsky was a Russo-centric author and thinker, cherishing the idea of his country's unique and in many ways decisive place in the world culture in history. Never tiring of reiterating the "Russian plight is the problem of the world, not Russia" postulate, he was ever on the look-out for some "strong leader" who would be able to organize and successfully see through the anti-Communist crusade. For a while Merezhkovsky thought he had found his hero in Benito Mussolini who, having sponsored his book on Dante, had several lengthy talks with the Russian writer on politics, literature and art. Impressed, Merezhkovsky started to see his new friend almost as an incarnation of Dante. In a letter addressed to Mussolini, he wrote:

The best, the truest and the liveliest document on Dante is – your personality. To understand Dante one has to live through him, but only you being around makes that possible. Two souls, his and yours, are merged into one, Infinity itself bringing you two together. Visualize Mussolini in contemplation, and it's Dante. Imagine Dante in action, and it's Mussolini.

All the while Merezhkovsky was trying to convince Mussolini that it was the latter's mission to start the "Holy War against Russia" (the idea formed the basis of his article "Meeting Mussolini", published by Illustrated Russia in February 1937). Seeing his name frequently mentioned by the Italian press in connection with Merezhkovsky's bizarre suggestions made the Duce uneasy and he took a step back. Visiting Rome in summer 1937, Merezhkovsky had talks with the Italian Foreign Minister, but failed to meet Mussolini. Then came the disillusionment, and in October of the same year he was already speaking of how disappointed he was with the Italian leader's "petty materialism". He tried to contact General Francisco Franco, now seeing Spain as the last anti-Communist citadel of Europe - and failed. Thus Merezhkovsky's choice of the new European "heroes" narrowed down to Adolf Hitler.

Merezhkovsky had never seen Fascism as an alternative to Communism. As early as 1930 he wrote of a doomed Europe stuck between the two "stores of explosives: Fascism and Communism", expressing hope that some day these two evils will somehow destroy one another. But the danger of the Fuhrer's possible subjugation of Europe was still the lesser evil for him – compared to possible Communist expansion. The "Hitler dilemma" was the only thing husband and wife ever disagreed on. Gippius hated and despised the Fuhrer, referring to him as "an idiot". Merezhkovsky thought he found a leader who'd be able to take the whole of Antichrist Kingdom upon himself, this outweighing for him such trivia as the fact that his own Joan of Arc (1939) was banned in Germany on the day of its release.

In summer 1939 Paramount (in collaboration with the French Association des Auteurs de Films) bought Merezhkovsky's scenario The Life of Dante. The production was cancelled on September 1, as World War II broke out in Europe. On September 9, fleeing the air raids, the Merezhkovskys moved to Biarritz in the south of France, where they spent the next three months, communicating mainly with the French and the English military officers, but also with Irina Odoyevtseva and her husband Georgy Ivanov.

On June 27, 1940 the German Wehrmacht occupied Biarritz. Here in a hotel on August 14 the writer's 75th anniversary celebration was held, organized by a group of French writers, with some notable Russians like Pavel Milyukov, Ivan Bunin and Mark Aldanov invited. It was there that Merezhkovsky made comments which (according to biographer Yuri Zobnin) were later presented by some memoirists as his "infamous German radio speech". Still, even Zobnin admits that there were reasons to regard Merezhkovsky as a Nazi sympathizer. In the autumn of 1941 Merezhkovsky found himself in the center of his German admirers – students, mostly, but army officers too. It was their German friends who helped the couple move back to Paris from Biarritz where they found themselves penniless and on the verge of homelessness. "Merezhkovsky flew up to the Nurnberg fires with the agitation of a newly born butterfly... By this time most of us stopped visiting them," wrote Vasily Janowski, a Green Lamp group member.

===== The "infamous radio speech" =====
Nobody is quite sure exactly how and why Merezhkovsky found himself on the German radio in June 1941. Gippius (according to Yury Terapiano who was quoting Nina Berberova) blamed her own secretary Vladimir Zlobin who, using his German connections, allegedly persuaded the elderly man to come to the studio in the early days of the Nazi invasion of the USSR. In his speech (if its printed version entitled "Bolshevism and Humanity" is to be believed) Merezhkovsky, comparing Hitler to Joan of Arc, called for an anti-Bolshevik crusade, reiterating, among other things, what he was saying all through the 1920s and 1930s:

Bolshevism will never change its nature... because right from the start it's been not a national, but international phenomenon. From the very first day Russia has been – and remains to this very day – only a means to the end: that of its conquering the whole world.

"This is the end for us," Gippius allegedly commented, disgusted and horrified. In the days to come, though, husband and wife (as those who knew them later attested) often expressed horror at the news of Nazis' atrocities on the Eastern front; according to Gippius' friend, poet Victor Mamchenko, Merezhkovsky far from supporting Hitler, in those days was actually condemning him.

Biographer Zobnin doubts that Merezhkovsky appeared on German radio at all, noting that none of the memoirists who mentioned it had himself heard Merezhkovsky speaking on air. All of those "witnesses" invariably referred to the printed version of the "speech" published in 1944 by Parizhsky Vestnik. This document, according to Zobnin (the author of the first comprehensive Merezhkovsky biography published in Russia) was most certainly a montage fake, concocted by Nazi propagandists out of the 1939 unpublished essay The Mystery of the Russian Revolution (on Dostoyevsky's Demons novel), with bits and pieces thrown in. The researcher insists such a speech could not have been broadcast in the late June: the couple resided in Biarritz and for an elderly person to give everybody a slip and somehow get to Paris was hardly probable.

Adding to the confusion is the well-documented fact that Merezhkovsky had already made one speech mentioning Hitler and Joan of Arc in one breath. It happened in August 1940 at his 75th-birthday celebration in Biarritz, and in a different context. In fact, his speech caused trouble because it was deemed too pro-Russian and anti-German. According to Teffi, one of the people present, —

On the huge hotel terrace under the guidance of countess G., the audience gathered, a German uniform seen here and there. Merezhkovsky pronounced a lengthy tirade which rather frightened the Russian camp. Targeting both bolsheviks and the [German] fascists, he spoke of the times when the nightmare finally ends, both Antichrists – one tormenting Russia, the other tormenting France – perish, and the 'Russia of Dostoyevsky' at last will be able to stretch a hand to the 'France of Pascal and Joan of Arc'. "Well, now they'll throw us out of the hotel, that's for sure," horrified Russian lodgers were whispering. But the Germans looked as if they never heard this prophecy: they applauded benevolently, along with others.

Irina Odoyevtseva independently corroborated this. "He was going on about the Atlantis and its demise. For those who understood Russian it was obvious that what he meant was Germany's defeat and Russia's imminent victory, but the Germans never understood this and applauded," she remembered. All this, according to Zobnin, makes the "infamous German radio speech" look very much like a Nazi propaganda myth, picked up first by Yuri Terapiano, then authenticated by numerous reiterations.

==== Merezhkovsky's death ====
For the last three months of his life Merezhkovsky was working continuously in the couple's Paris flat, trying to finish Little Theresa. On December 6 husband and wife returned from one of their regular walks and spent the evening, in Gippius' words, "arguing, as usual, about the Russia versus freedom dilemma." Skipping both supper and his habitual evening cigarette, Merezhkovsky went to his room early. Next morning the maid called Gippius to tell her the man was in some kind of trouble. Merezhkovsky was sitting unconscious next to a cold fireplace. The doctor arrived in 15 minutes' time and diagnosed brain hemorrhage. In half an hour Merezhkovsky was pronounced dead. "...Me, I'm a worm, not man, slandered by humans, despised by peoples (Ps. 21, 7). But wrap itself into a chrysalis a hapless worm does only to break out as a shiny white, sunlight-like, resurrected butterfly," these were his last written words found on a piece of paper on a table. The funeral service was held on December 10 in the Orthodox church of Saint Aleksandr Nevsky. Dmitry Merezhkovsky was buried at the Sainte-Genevieve-des-Bois Russian Cemetery, with just several people attending the ceremony.

== Merezhkovsky's ideas ==
Merezhkovsky's first adopted philosophical trend was the then popular positivism. Soon, disillusioned in this idea, although never rejecting it wholly, Merezhkovsky turned to religion. Seeds of this hybrid (European positivism grafted to what's been described as "the subjective idealism" of Russian Orthodoxy) sown on the field of literature study brought forth a brochure entitled "On the Causes of the Decline and the New Trends in Contemporary Russian Literature". This manifesto gave a burgeoning Russian Symbolist movement both ideology and the name as such: Merezhkovsky was the first in Russia to speak of symbols as definitive means of cognizance in modern Art.

In the center of this new train of thought was the notion of "rejecting the rational in favour of the intuitive" by means of exploiting what the author termed as "spirituality of a symbol," seeing the latter as a perfect means of describing Reality, otherwise unfathomable. Only through a symbol, according to Merezhkovsky, one could get to an object's deeper meaning, whereas (quoting, as he did, Tyutchev) "thought, whilst being spoken, turns a lie":

In poetry the unspoken things, flickering through the beauty of symbol, affect us stronger than what's expressed by words. Symbolism endows both style and essence of poetry with spirituality; poetic word becomes clear and translucent as walls of alabaster amphora carrying flame... Longing for things that have never been experienced yet, looking for undertones yet unknown, searching out dark and unconscious things in our sensual world is the coming Ideal poetry's main characteristics. [...] The three principal elements of the new art are: the mystic essence, symbolism and the expansion of artist's impressiveness. – Dmitry Merezhkovsky.

According to scholar D.Churakov, Merezhkovsky, pronouncing "the death of metaphysics" and putting forward the idea that only language of symbols could be an adequate instrument for discovering the modern world's pattern of meanings, was unwillingly following Auguste Comte, the difference being that the latter was employing these ideas in scientific fields, while the former proposed to use them in literature and criticism.

=== The Third Testament ===
Merezhkovsky's next and most fundamental step ahead as a self-styled modernist philosophy leader was taken in tandem with his young intellectual wife Zinaida Gippius who from the first days of their meeting started generating new ideas for her husband to develop. Thus the Third Testament theory was born, or rather revived, transplanted from its Middle Ages Italian origins into the early 20th century's Russian ambience. It was the Third Testament that formed the basis of the early 20th-century Russian New Religious Consciousness movement which in turn kick started the Religious-Philosophical Society into action, again Gippius producing basic ideas for her husband to formulate. Borrowing the original idea from Joachim of Fiore, a 12th-century theologist, Merezhkovskys created and developed their own concept of man's full-circle religious evolution. In it the Bible was seen as a starting point with God having taken two steps towards Man, for the latter to respond with the third, logically conclusive one.

According to Merezhkovsky, the First (Divine Father's) and the Second (Divine Son's) Testaments could be seen only as preliminary steps towards the Third one, that of the Holy Ghost. With the first maintaining the Law of God and the second – the Grace of God, what the third Testament should do is bring Liberation to the human race; the First Testament revealing God's power as the gospel Truth, the Second transforming the gospel Truth into Love, the Third translating Love into Liberation. In this last Kingdom "pronounced and heard will be – the final, never before revealed name of the coming one: God the Liberator," according to the author.

Merezhkovsky saw the Third Testament as a synthesis of the two original revelations: that "about Earth" (pre-Christian beliefs) and that "about Heaven" (Christianity). The Mystery of the Holy Trinity, when resolved, should link three elements into a circle, the great "new Earth under the new Heavens," as promised in the Book of the Apocalypse. As Rozanov put it, "Merezhkovsky's greatest innovation was this attempt to merge together the two – the Christian and the Heathen – poles of poignancy. To discover a 'tempting vice' in the greatest of virtues and the greatest of virtues in the tempting vice." This New Trinity concept implied that the all-inviting Holy Ghost was not a sexless spirit, but a female entity.

==== Sex and spirituality ====
Human history, according to Merezhkovsky, was one ceaseless "battle of two abysses": the abyss of Flesh (as discovered by pre-Christians) and the abyss of Spirit (opened by Christianity's sexless asceticism). Pre-Christians celebrated flesh-driven sensuality at the expense of spirituality. Ascetic Christians brought about the rise of Spirit, at the expense of sex. Merezhkovsky declared the dialectical inevitability of thesis and antithesis' coming together, of the spiritual and the sexual poles uniting on a higher, celestial level.

In his own words, "Being aware of myself in my body, I'm at the root of personality. Being aware of myself in the other one's body, I'm at the root of sex. Being aware of myself in all human bodies, I am at the root of unity". Noticing that one of the Aramaic languages translates Spirit as Rucha, a female entity, Merezhkovsky interpreted the Holy Trinity as Father and Son's unity in the higher being, their common godly Mother. It is the latter's Kingdom Come that the Third Testament was supposed to lead to. Seeing both God and man as intrinsically unisexual, Merezhkovsky regarded a male/female schism to be a symptom of imperfection, the cause for primal human being's fatal disintegration.

In the modern times, according to Merezhkovsky, both monastic and ascetic Christianity will cease to exist. Art would not just adopt religious forms, but become an integral part of religion, the latter taken in broader concept. Human evolution as he saw it, would lead to merging of whatever had been polarized: sex and spirit, religion and culture, male and female, et cetera – bringing about Kingdom Come, not 'out there', but 'here on Earth'.

=== Merezhkovsky and "religious anarchism" ===
Man's evolutional progress towards the Third Testament Kingdom Come will not be without some revolutionary upheavals, according to Merezhkovsky, will be strewn with "catastrophes", most of them dealing with the "revolution of Spirit." The consequence of such revolution would bring about gradual change in the nature of religion itself, the latter taking under its spacious wing not only man's sensual liberation but also the latter's "freedom of rebellion." "We are human only as long as we're rebels," Merezhkovsky insisted, expressing what some saw as a proto-existentialist idea.

One result of the "revolution of Spirit" should be the severing of ties between state and religion, according to Merezhkovsky. "The Church – not the old, but the new, eternal, universal one – is as opposite to the idea of the state as an absolute truth is opposing an absolute lie," he declared in an open letter to Berdyaev.

B. Rozental, analyzing Merezhkovsky's political and religious philosophy, thus summed up the writer's position: "The Law amounts to violence... The difference between legitimate power that holds violence 'in reserve' and violence itself is but a matter of degree: sinful are both. Autocracy and murder are nothing more than the two extreme forms of exhibiting [criminal] power." Interpreting the Biblical version of the human history as a sequence of revolutionary events, Merezhkovsky saw religion and revolution as inseparable. It is just that for a social revolution to succeed, spiritual revolution should always come one step ahead of it. In Russia the lack of the latter brought about the former's fiasco, with Antichrist taking hold of things, he argued.

In the 1920s Merezhkovsky lost interest in the religious anarchism doctrine. In his later years he became close to ecumenical ideals, prophesying the Kingdom Come as a synthesis of "Peter, Paul and John's principles", that is, bringing Catholic, Protestant and Eastern Orthodox traditions together.

== Legacy ==
Throughout his lifetime Dmitry Merezhkovsky polarized opinion in his native Russia, bringing upon himself both praise and scorn, occasionally from the same quarters. According to Yevgeny Yevtushenko, Merezhkovsky became Russia's first ever "new-type, universal kind of a dissident who managed to upset just about everybody who thought themselves to be responsible for guarding morality and order":

The Tsarist government saw Merezhkovsky as subverting the state foundations, patriarchs of official Orthodoxy regarded him a heretic, for literary academia he was a decadent, for Futurists – a retrograde, for Lev Trotsky, this ardent global revolution ideologist, – a reactionary. Sympathetic Anton Chekhov's words came and went unnoticed: 'A believer he is, a believer of an apostolic kind'.

In the words of a modern biographer, "he will find his place in history alongside Marquis de Sade, Nietzsche and Henry Miller, those classics who only through being condemned and ostracized by the many could be approached and appreciated by the few." "I was disliked and scolded in Russia, loved and praised abroad, but misunderstood, both here and there," Merezhkovsky wrote in a letter to Nikolai Berdyaev.

Merezhkovsky has been given credit for his exceptional erudition, the scientific approach to writing, literary gift and stylistic originality. Seen in retrospect as the first ever (and, arguably, the only one) Russian "cabinet writer of a European type," Merezhkovsky was, according to Berdyayev, "one of the best-educated people in Saint Petersburg of the first quarter of the 20th century." Korney Chukovsky, pondering on the dire state of the early 20th century Russia's cultural elite, admitted that "the most cultured of them all" was this "mysterious, unfathomable, almost mythical creature, Merezhkovsky". Anton Chekov insisted that the Russian Academy of Sciences should appoint Merezhkovsky its honorary academic, in as early as 1902.

Merezhkovsky was the first in Russia to formulate the basic principles of Symbolism and Modernism, as opposed to 'decadence', a tag he was battling with. Never aspiring to a leading role in the movement, he soon became, according to I. Koretskaya, "a kind of handy encyclopedia for the ideology of Symbolism," which others "could borrow aesthetic, socio-historical and even moral ideas from." Having added a new ("thought-driven") dimension to the genre of historical novel and turning it into a modern art form, Merezhkovsky influenced Andrey Bely and Aleksey Remizov, as well as Valery Bryusov, Aleksey N. Tolstoy, Mikhail Bulgakov and Mark Aldanov. It was Merezhkovsky who introduced such concepts as a "modernist novel" and a "symbolic historical novel" to the conservative Russian literature scene of the late 1890s.

Merezhkovsky was praised as an engaging essayist and "a master of quote-juggling." Some critics loathed the repetitiveness in Merezhkovsky's prose, others admired his (in a broad sense) musical manner of employing certain ideas almost as symphonic themes, which was new at the time.

No less influential, even if so much more controversial, were Merezhkovsky's philosophical, religious and political ideas. Alongside the obvious list of contemporary followers (Bely, Blok, etc.; almost all of them later became detractors) deeply interested in his theories were political figures (Fondaminsky, Kerensky, Savinkov), psychologists (Freud), philosophers (Berdyaev, Rickert, Stepun), lawyers (Kowalewsky). Thomas Mann wrote of Merezhkovsky as of a "genius critic and specialist in a world psychology, second only to Nietzsche." Notable other Germans influenced by Merezhkovsky included Arthur Moeller van den Bruck and Alfred Rosenberg

Later researchers noted Merezhkovsky's willingness to question dogmas and thwart tradition with disregard to public opinion, never shying away from controversy and even scandal. Crucial in this context (according to O. Dafier) was his "quest for ways of overcoming deep crisis which came as a result of the Russian traditionalist Church losing its credibility."

=== Criticism ===
In Russia the general response to Merezhkovsky's literary, cultural and social activities was negative. His prose, even if on the face of it stylistically flawless and occasionally accessible, was, critics argued, an elitist thing unto itself, "hermetically closed for the uninitiated majority." "Having isolated himself from real life, Merezhkovsky built up the inner temple for his own personal use. Me-and-culture, me-and-Eternity – those were his recurring themes," wrote in 1911 Leon Trotsky.

For all his scientifically strict, academic approach to the process of collecting and re-processing material, contemporary academia, with little exception, ridiculed Merezhkovsky, dismissing him as a gifted charlatan, bent on rewriting history in accordance with his own current ideological and philosophical whims. Due to his incorrigible, as many saw it, tendency towards inconsistency, Merezhkovsky's old allies deserted him, while new ones approached him warily. Vasily Rozanov wrote in 1909:

Merezhkovsky is a Thing that ceaselessly speaks; a jacket and trousers combination producing a torrent of noise... To clear grounds for more speaking activity, once in three years he undergoes a total change of mental wardrobe and for the following three years busies himself in defying all things he was maintaining previously.

Another former friend, Minsky, questioned Merezhkovsky's credibility as a critic, finding in his biographies a tendency to see in his subjects only things that he wanted to see, skillfully "re-moulding questions into instant answers."

For all his religiosity, Merezhkovsky was never popular with either Russian Orthodox Church officials or the religious intellectual elite of the time, people like Sergey Bulgakov, Pavel Florensky and Lev Shestov fiercely denouncing his ideas and projects. Similarly, the reputation of a radical Social democrat hasn't made Merezhkovsky popular in the leftist literary camp. He was variously described as "an anti-literature phenomenon" (Viktor Shklovsky), "the greatest corpse in the Russian literature" (Ivanov-Razumnik) and "a book-worm", totally "foreign to all things human" (Korney Chukovsky).

The writer's work published in emigration was, according to the 1934 Soviet Literary encyclopedia "the telling example of the ideological degradation and cultural degeneration of the White emigres." Maxim Gorky's verdict: "Dmitry Merezhkovsky, a well-known God-admirer of a Christian mode, is a small man whose literary activity is akin to that of a type-writer: each type is clear and well-read, but it's soul-less and boring," served as a leitmotif of the Soviet literary officialdom's view on Merezhkovsky for decades. In the Soviet times the writer was (in the words of Alexander Men) "aggressively forgotten," his works unofficially banned up until the early 1990s, when the floodgate of re-issues opened the way for serious critical analysis of Merezhkovsky's life and legacy.

== Select bibliography ==
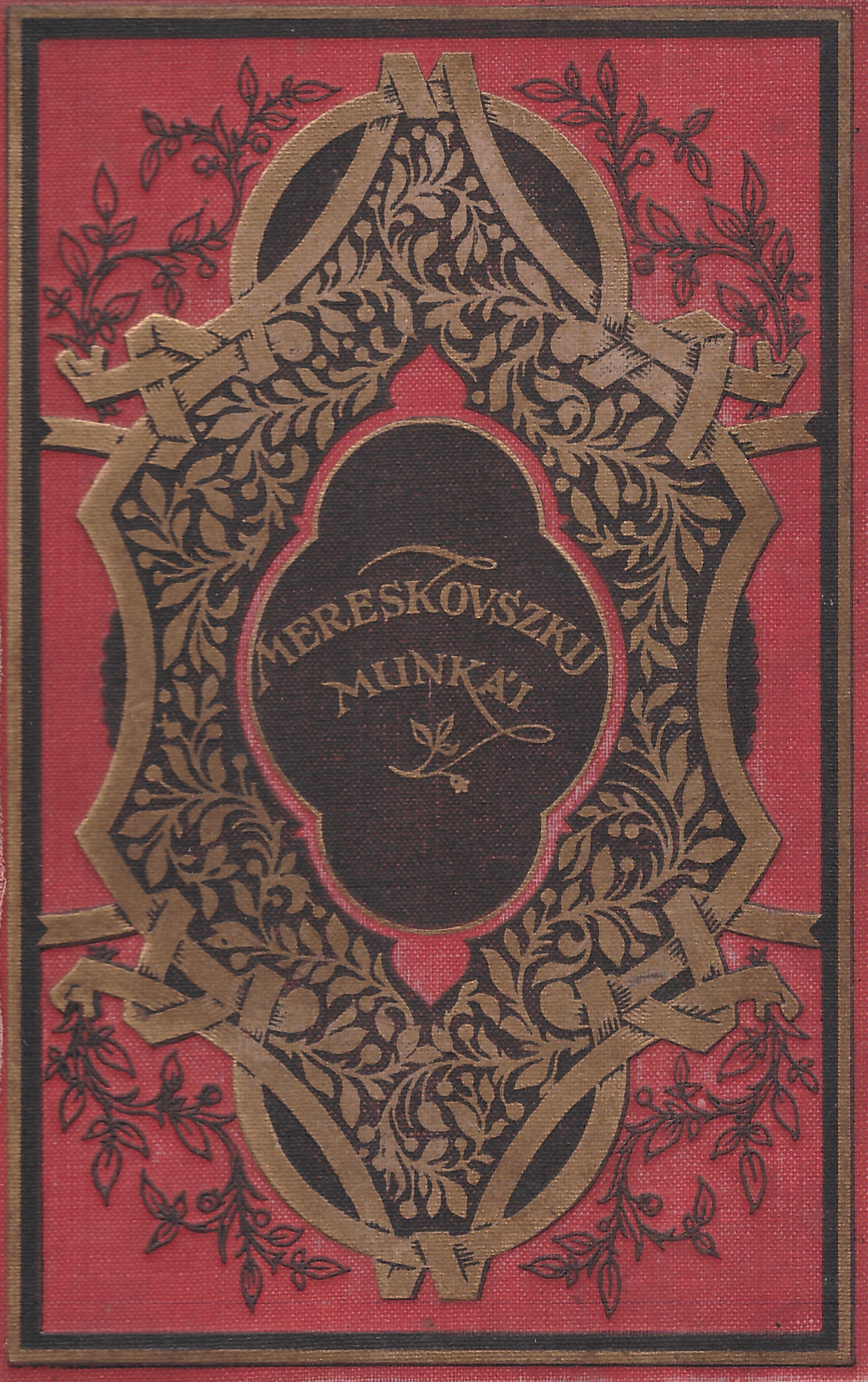
Hungarian edition (c. 1920s)

=== Novels ===
Christ and Antichrist trilogy

- The Death of the Gods. Julian the Apostate (Christ and Antichrist trilogy, 1895).
- Resurrection of Gods. Leonardo da Vinci (book 2 of the Christ and Antichrist trilogy, 1900). ISBN 4-87187-839-2, books.google
- Peter and Alexis (book 3 of the Christ and Antichrist trilogy, 1904)

The Kingdom of the Beast

- Paul I (Pavel Pervy, 1908)
- Alexander the First (Aleksandr Pervy, 1913)
- December 14 (Chetyrnadtsatoye Dekabrya, 1918)

=== Non-fiction ===
- On the Causes of the Decline and on the New Trends in Contemporary Russian Literature (1892)
- The Eternal Companions (1897)
- Tolstoy and Dostoevsky (1901)
- The Forthcoming Ham (Gryadushchu Ham, 1905)
- Sick Russia (Bolnaya Rossia, 1910)
- The Birth of Gods. Tutankhamen in Crete (1925)
- Messiah (1928)
- The Mystery of the Three: Egypt and Babylon (1925)
- Mystery of the West: Atlantis-Europe (1930)
- Unknown Jesus (1932)
- Jesus Manifest (1935) (1936, First American Edition)

=== Plays ===
- Sylvio (1890)
- The Storm is Over (1893)
- Poppy Blossom (Makov Tzvet, 1908, with Gippius and Filosofov)
- The Last Saint (Posledny Svyatoy, 1908)
- Pavel the First (Pavel Pervy, 1908), part 1 of the Kingdom of the Beast trilogy.
- Joy Will Come (Radost Budet, 1916)
- The Romantics (Romantiki, 1916)

=== Poetry ===
- Poems (1883–1888)
- Protopop Avvacum (1888)
- Vera (1890)
- The Family Idyll (Semeynaya idillia, 1890),
- Death (Smert, 1891)
- Symbols. Poems and Songs (1892)
- End of the Century (Konetz Veka, 1893)
