= Pyotr Pertsov =

Russian critic, memoirist, editor, poet (1868–1947)

Pyotr Petrovich Pertsov
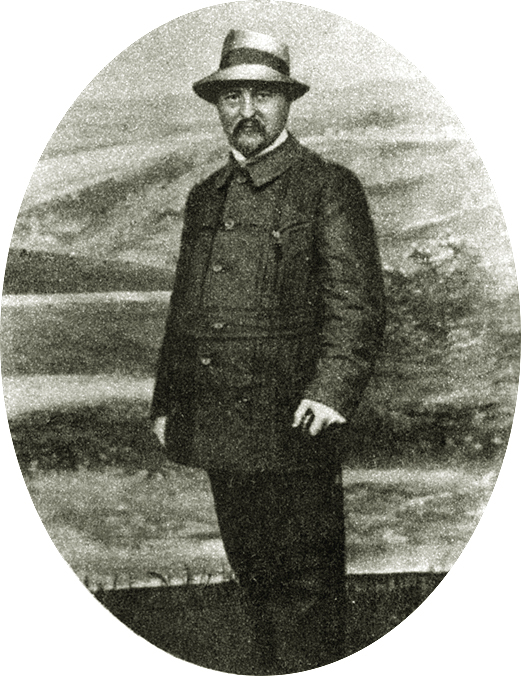
- Pertsov in 1890s
- Born: Пётр Петрович Перцов; June 16, 1868; Kazan, Russian Empire
- Died: May 19, 1947 (aged 78); Moscow, USSR
- Occupations: poet, literary critic, publisher, editor, memoirist
- Years active: 1880s – 1930s

Pyotr Petrovich Pertsov (Russian: Пётр Петро́вич Перцо́в; 16 June 1868 — 19 May 1947) was a Russian poet, publisher, editor, literary critic, journalist and memoirist associated with the Russian Symbolist movement.

== Biography ==
Pyotr Petrovich Pertsov was born in Kazan, a son of Pyotr Petrovich, the youngest of the four Pertsov brothers. His uncles Vladimir, Konstantin and Erast were well-known journalists; the latter, a poet, in 1831-1832 was closely linked to Alexander Pushkin. Pyotr Pertsov studied in the 2nd Kazan Gymnasium. In 1887 he enrolled into the Kazan University to study law. He graduated in 1892.

In 1890 Pertsov published his first poems in Saint Petersburg newspapers Nedelya (Week) and Novosti (News) to some favourable reviews, including the one by Afanasy Fet. In 1892 he became friends with Nikolai Mikhaylovsky and joined the staff of Russkoye Bogatstvo, then a liberal narodnik's magazine, as a head of the bibliography department. The infatuation with narodnichestvo, though, was short-lived and a year later Pertsov quit. In 1894, engaged by his new friends, Valery Bryusov, Dmitry Merezhkovsky and Fyodor Sologub, he started to contribute to Severny Vestnik, the Russian Symbolist movement's early tribune.

In 1895 Pertsov compiled and published the Young Poetry (Молодая поэзия) compilation, featuring the works by Balmont, Bryusov, Minsky and Merezhkovsky. It was followed by another compilation in 1896, Philosophical Trends of Russian Poetry (Философские течения русской поэзии). It was Pertsov who inspired Merezhkovsky to release his acclaimed book of essays The Eternal Companions. Portraits from the World Literature (1897). He published the early works of Vasily Rozanov and introduced the latter to the Symbolist circle.

In 1898 Severny Vestnik closed and in 1902 Gippius and Merezkovsky invited Pertsov, now a popular literary entrepreneur, to join their newly founded magazine Novy Put as an editor/publisher. This entailed a series of disagreements, and in 1904 Dmitry Filosofov succeeded Pertsov as a formal head of this publication. In 1906 Pertsov (whose works were published regularly by Mir Iskusstva, among other magazines) became the editor of newspaper Slovo’s literary supplement. In the early 1910s he started to actively contribute to Alexey Suvorin-led Novoye Vremya.

=== 1917-1947 ===
After the 1917 Revolution Pertsov resided in the Kostroma region, lectured at Kostroma University, worked in the Narkompros' museums department. In 1927 the collection The Correspondence of V.Y.Bryusov and P.P.Pertsov came out, featuring the first 32 (of 173) Bryusov's letters from Pertsov's archive. He published several museum guidebooks and the Literary Memoirs. 1890-1902 (Academia, 1934), all the while working on his magnum opus The Basics of the Cosmonomy which remained unfinished. Neither occasional publications, nor lecturing brought Pertsov much money; he received no pension and lived in poverty. Only in 1942 friends helped him to become a member of the Soviet Union of Writers.

Pyotr Petrovich Pertsov died on May 19, 1947. He was buried at the Alekseyevskoye Cemetery in Moscow. The obituary signed by Shchepkina-Kupernik and Shyusev among others, was sent to Literaturnaya Gazeta, which refused to publish it.
