= L. Tolstoy and Dostoyevsky =

1900 literary essay by Dmitry Merezhkovsky

L. Tolstoy and Dostoyevsky is a literary essay written by Dmitry Merezhkovsky, comparing the creativity and worldview of the Russian authors Leo Tolstoy and Fyodor Dostoevsky. Published between 1900 and 1901 in Mir Iskusstva magazine, it was based on research Merezhkovsky conducted from 1898 to 1902. Its publication coincided with Leo Tolstoy's excommunication by Most Holy Synod and drew wide public response. L. Tolstoy and Dostoyevsky is considered the most significant work of Merezhkovsky in the genre of literary research and was subsequently recognized as the most detailed and accurate study of Leo Tolstoy's work.

The essay is partly devoted to the history of Russian literature, but also reflects Merezhovsky's changing perception of the world. The ideological basis for the essay was founded upon the dilemma between Christianity and Paganism. Alexander Men noted that Tolstoy was described as a pagan "a secret seer of flesh", which was contrary to the "seer of spirit" of Fyodor Dostoyevsky. In his research, Merezhovsky continued to look for a synthesis between the Old Testament, which spoke of the flesh, and the New Testament, which spoke of the spirit.

Merezhovsky was not the first author to analyse the work of Tolstoy. In 1856, Nikolay Chernyshevsky wrote the article "Childhood and Adolescence. War Stories by Count Leo Tolstoy". Dmitry Pisarev wrote the articles "Lapses into Immature Thought" about the narratives "Childhood", "Adoloscence", "Youth"; and "Old Nobility" regarding the novel "War and Peace". Analyses of Tolstoy were also carried out by contemporaries Nikolay Nekrasov, Saltykov-Schedrin, Nikolay Mikhaylovsky, Maxim Gorky, and Veresaev, however Merezhovsky was later recognized by many as providing the most detailed and thorough analysis of them all.

== Background ==
By the beginning of the 20th century, Merezhkovsky was heavily engaged in getting to grips with issues related to Christianity and the Church Cathedral. G. Adamovich, in his article “Merezhkovsky”, recalled that “if a conversation was really lively and if there was tension present, then sooner or later Merezhovsky would fall back on his favourite subject — the significance and meaning of the Gospel. Up until the word 'Gospel' was uttered, a dispute remained superficial and the interlocutors had the sense they were playing hide and seek." Having determined the course of his philosophical quest for the history of Russian literature, Merezhkovsky decided to articulate it by contrasting Russian literature's two classics.

In the meantime, the "Determination of the Holy Synod No. 557 with a message to the faithful children of the Orthodox Greek-Russian Church about Count Leo Tolstoy" was published on 23 February 1901, at which point Tolstoy's fierce conflict with the church unfolded. As a whole, the Russian Intelligentsia sympathized with the writer. The press published satiric essays and pamphlets directed against the Synod and parodies of Pobedonostsev.

"His name was on everyone's lips, all eyes were turned on Yasnaya Polyana: the existence of Leo Tolstoy was felt in every fiber of the spiritual life of the country, every minute of the day", recalled P.P. Pertsov. "We have two Tsars: Nicolas II and Leo Tolstoy. Which of them is stronger? Nicholas II cannot harm Tolstoy in any way and can't steal away his throne, whereas Tolstoy undoubtedly shakes the foundations of Nicholas II's throne and dynasty", wrote Aleksey Suvorin.

After the deterioration of Tolstoy's health at the address of "Torquemada"-Pobedonostsev, definitive threats were uttered within the radical student community. "At the present time, students' heads are spinning with the anticipated death of Tolstoy. Under such circumstances, prudence requires me to vacate Moscow, where it is impossible to hide," wrote Pobedonostsev.

Merezhkovsky very openly expressed support for the church's position, however, he noted in a letter to the Chairman of the Neophilological Society, Alexander Veselovsky, "My attitude towards Tolstoy, although entirely censored, is not hostile, rather sympathetic."

== Content ==
Merezhovsky formulated the main concept behind the essay in the preface to the Collected Works. The book, he said, was dedicated to the struggle between the two principles in Russian literature, the opposition of the two truths — the Divine Truth and the Human Truth. The author considers Tolstoy to be the successor of the "earthly principal, the Human Truth" in Russian literature, and Dostoevsky to be the bearer of the spiritual principle, the Divine Truth. When comparing the two writers, Merezhovsky tracks the origins of their work back to Alexander Pushkin: "He [Tolstoy] and Dostoevsky are both akin and opposite to each other, just as the most powerful branches of a tree are; diverging in opposite directions at the top, while fused into one trunk at their base. "Four of the seven chapters of the book contain an assessment of Tolstoy the artist, in which Merezhovsky provides a detailed appraisal of the writer's art. Merezhovsky defines Tolstoy's main artistic technique as a transition "from visible to invisible, from external to internal, from physical to spiritual" or at the very least, "instinctual".

The author believed that only by revealing the "secrets of the flesh", Tolstoy approaches an understanding of the "secrets of the spirit." Dostoevsky, on the other hand, moves from the inner to the outer, from spiritual to physical. As a substantiation of his thesis, Merezhkovsky developed the idea that Tolstoy offers the reader a lot of artistic details which help to reveal the inner essence of each hero. Dostoevsky's portraits appear rigid, however they take flight in a reader's imagination thanks to their spiritual content.

Merezhovsky scrutinized Tolstoy's relationship with nature, deeming it to be "divided" — for the Christian Tolstoy, nature is "something dark, evil, bestial, even demonic...", however from his unconscious Pagan tendencies he believed that "man blends in with nature, disappears in it like a drop in the ocean".

On exploring the "hidden acts" within Tolstoy's works, Merezhovsky notes that the author perceives his craft to be "imperceptible, too ordinary" to present as unusual. The author believes that Tolstoy was the first to uncover a revelation which had escaped the attention of other writers " that a smile is reflected not only upon the face, but also in the sound of a voice; a voice, just like a face, can smile".

Merezhovsky considers yet another strength of Tolstoy's to be his extraordinary ability to reinvent himself, his ability to feel what others feel "in respect of their personality, age, unbringing, class...". "His emotional experience is inexhaustible, it is as if he has lived a hundred of lives in other peoples' and animals' bodies," writes the author. According to Merezhovsky, it is thanks to Tolstoy's great "emotional experience" that he has an extraordinary ability to portray "that part of flesh which is inclined towards the spirit, and that part of the spirit which is inclined towards the flesh - that mysterious area where Beast and God struggle together".

== "Leo Tolstoy's attitude towards Christianity" ==
Originally "aesthetic" complaints were made against Merezohvsky, however these soon gave way to "social and ideological complaints". This came about after February 6, 1901 (shortly before the publication of "Definition"), when Merezhovsky read the paper "Leo Tolstoy's attitude towards Christianity" at the Philosophical Society of Saint Petersburg Imperial University. The reading, which took place in the Council Hall of the Saint Petersburg Imperial University, lead to a heated debate that dragged on well past midnight. Yuri Zobnin noted that among the intelligentsia, Merezhovsky clearly "swam against the tide of opinion, it was learned of immediately and caused an immediate negative reaction," as a result no-one delved further into the nuances of his critique of "Tolstoy's religion".

Immediately after Merezhovsky's paper "Leo Tolstoy's attitude towards Christianity", an angry rebuke from the populist publicist Alexander Protopopov appeared in the press: "This paper makes a bad impression. You can love and hate Tolstoy, you can agree and disagree with him, but butchering Tolstoy "like a fool"... is akin to...a nursery rhyme about an elephant and a pug..." he wrote. In addition to this, Protopopov gave Merezhovsky the following characterization:

"Merezhkovsky was born a mere 35 years ago. After graduating from a historical and philological course, Mr. Merezhkovsky quickly assimilates himself into "good society" - he publishes his poems in the "Bulletin of Europe" and other reputable magazines. The original and translated versions are followed by critical articles and historical novels. Thanks to the copycat Nadson, Mr. Merezhkovsky becomes a populist, then a symbolist, and finally - an admirer of "pure beauty" and a Nietzschean, and most recently, clearly also consigns himself to Nietzscheism ... S. A. Vengerov characterizes Mr. Merezhkovsky as someone who is especially prone to "bookish moods": "Whatever the last book says to his soul, will remain uppermost ..." Such is Tolstoy's butcher. - "Odessa News". 1901. No. 5241

The liberal press launched a campaign against Merezhovsky; for example, Merezhkovsky's paper was deemed an invocation of "St. Bartholomew's Night" ("Eastern Review" 1901, No. 85). Protesting, Merezhkovsky penned a letter to the editorial offices of the capital's newspapers, in which he pointed out the unacceptable pressure being exerted on him - condemning it as the "oppression of public opinion." The letter merely caused a fresh wave of mockery: “In one of Garshin's stories, a lizard hatches, whose tail has been torn off 'for her beliefs.' With G. Merezhkovsky's protest he likens himself to this lizard, the only difference is that the “tail” of Mr. Merezhkovsky is intact: there is not one who thinks it worthwhile in tearing it off”, - wrote the newspaper“ Novosti ”(1901. № 149).

== Reviews from Critics ==
The dissertation "Leo Tolstoy and Dostoevsky" was published for a year on the pages of Mir Iskusstva and caused persistent irritation among the conservative readers, who considered Merezhovsky's views regarding Russian classics as unacceptably "liberal".

"A seemingly infinite article lingers in 'Mir Iskusstva' written by Mr Merezhovsky about Leo Tolstoy and Dostoevsky, which like all of Mr Merezhovsky's critical articles, is a characteristic porridge made up of honey and tar. Mr Merezhovsky has surpassed himself this time, however. On speaking of Anna Karenina, Mr Merezhovsky attempts to place the heroine of this novel among Tolstoy's other creations and in order to do this he compares Anna Karenina...to Vronsky's horse Fru-Fru...That's how well they write in Mir Iskusstva!"

One of the few contemporaries who appreciated Merezhovsky's work on Tolstoy and Dostoevsky was Vasily Rozanov. He believed that "before us ... is an entirely new phenomenon for our critique: object criticism instead of subjective criticism, the dissection of a writer, and not the profession of oneself". Pozanov wrote:

"Merezhovsky bared his chest to Tolstoy, like a Hellen to a Barbarian, with true sincerity and great artistic strength. He has grappled with "inactivity", "a lack of marriage", a superficial "resurrection", and a great many spells of boredom and drought from Tolstoy over the last few years"...At this point he has taken in hand a Tolstoy who, in recent years, is dismally symbolic, constantly constricted, entirely negative and uninspired, empty and devoid of life."

Nikolai Berdyaev who, as a whole, classified Merezhovsky's work to be of high quality, nevertheless noted in his article "New Christianity" that the author "never fully understood or truly appreciated" Tolstoy.

Zinaida Gippius in her book "Dmitry Merezhovsky" explained that the essence of the author's predisposition lay at the heart of her research: "Naturally, Dostoevsky should have been, and was, closer to Merezhovsky than Tolstoy. It is for this reason that he lent more in his direction and was likely a little unfair towards Tolstoy".

Georgy Adamovich wrote that L. Tolstoy and Dostoevsky "was of great importance and had not yet been fully realised". Recognising its somewhat schematic nature ("especially in the section concerning Tolstoy"), he noted that it gave "a new in-depth view of War and Peace and The Brothers Karamazov, a view that was later adopted and developed far and wide. Many of our critics and indeed writers, do not truly realize to what extent they owe Merezhovsky for what they consider to be their own property".

As noted by Yuri Zobnin, before Merezhkovsky's works, a literary critic usually "assigned" a certain "meaning" to the text of the analyzed author, relying on biographical documents that made it possible to formulate an "a writer's opinion", and viewed his work (or more specifically, their "ideologically significant" fragments) exactly the same as "biographical evidence". Merezhkovsky was the first to approach a text trying to extract its "meaning" from the elements of its aesthetic structure. In essence, he concludes that in Merezhovsky's essay “... for the first time in the history of Russian literary criticism, hermeneutic methods were applied”.

Much of Merezhovksy's work (principally highlights such as "Eternal Companions", his research on L. Tolstoy and Dostoevsky, and his work on Gogol) was perceived as great literary events; his book on Tolstoy and Dostoevsky, already appreciated by those "close" and relatively "distant" at the time of its creation, was subsequently (despite many fundamental and private disagreements) praised more than once as a landmark for the evolution of Russian criticism and literary studies.
