= Novy Put =

- Editor: Pyotr Pertsov; Dmitry Filosofov
- Frequency: Monthly
- Founded: 1902
- Final issue: 1904
- Country: Russian Empire
- Based in: Saint Petersburg
- Language: Russian

Novy Put (Но′вый путь, New Way) was a Russian religious, philosophical and literary magazine, founded in 1902 in Saint Petersburg by Dmitry Merezhkovsky and Zinaida Gippius. Initially a literary vehicle for the Religious and Philosophical Meetings, it was aiming to promote the so-called "Godseeking" doctrine through the artistic means of Russian Symbolism.

== History ==
The first issue of Novy Put came out in November 1902. The magazine's editor-in-chief was Pyotr Pertsov, but the real leaders were Dmitry Merezhkovsky and Zinaida Gippius. The magazine, addressing the Saint Petersburg's intelligentsia, stood in opposition to the Moscow branch of Symbolists which gathered round the Scorpion publishing house and were led by Valery Bryusov.

Novy Put remained loyal to Symbolism's initial values ("Arts for arts' sake", the cult of individuality) even if Merezhkovskys have by this time condemned "the new individualism" which, as Gippius put it, "devoured our society as a whole and is bound to eat Art too."

While Mir Iskusstva (the magazine the Merezhkovskys were in close contact earlier) boasted a large and lavishly illustrated arts section, Novy Put was structured in accordance with the Russian 'thick journal' tradition. The poetry was provided mostly by the Symbolists: Konstantin Balmont, Fyodor Sologub, Jurgis Baltrušaitis, Nikolai Minsky, Valery Bryusov, Alexander Blok, Merezhkovsky and Gippius. The prose section's most prominent publication turned out to be Merezhkovsky's Peter and Alexis, the third and final novel of the Christ and Antichrist trilogy. Also published in Novy Put were Gippius' short stories, The Sting of Death by Fyodor Sologub, works by Alexei Remizov, Boris Zaytsev, Sergeyev-Tsensky.

More popular proved to be the non-literary sections, like "The Notes from the Religious and Philosophical Meetings," "Religious and Philosophical Chronicles," "From the Private Correspondence" and "One's Private Corner," the latter hosted by Vasily Rozanov. Here the authors could experiment freely without feeling constrained by the Merezhkovskys' ideological schemes. Among the notable works of non-fiction published by Novy Put were "The Hellenic Religion of the Suffering God" by Vyacheslav Ivanov and "Spiritualism as Antichristianity" by Pavel Florensky.

In summer 1904 Pertsov was succeeded by Dmitry Filosofov as an editor-in-chief. The ban, imposed upon the publication of the Religious and Philosophical Society's protocols, as well as financial problems caused the decline of the magazine's popularity. As Nikolai Berdyayev, Sergey Bulgakov, Nikolai Lossky and Semyon Frank arrived, the magazine solidified its position, yet drifted away from its originally declared mission. In the late 1904 Merezhkovsky and Gippius quit Novy Put, remaining on friendly terms with its new leaders and their influential Philosophy section. In the early 1905 the publication of Novy Put stopped and, for subscribers, was temporarily substituted by another journal, Voprosy Zhizny (Life Questions) edited by Lossky.
