= The Death of the Gods =

1895 novel by Dmitry Merezhkovsky

The Death of the Gods. Julian the Apostate
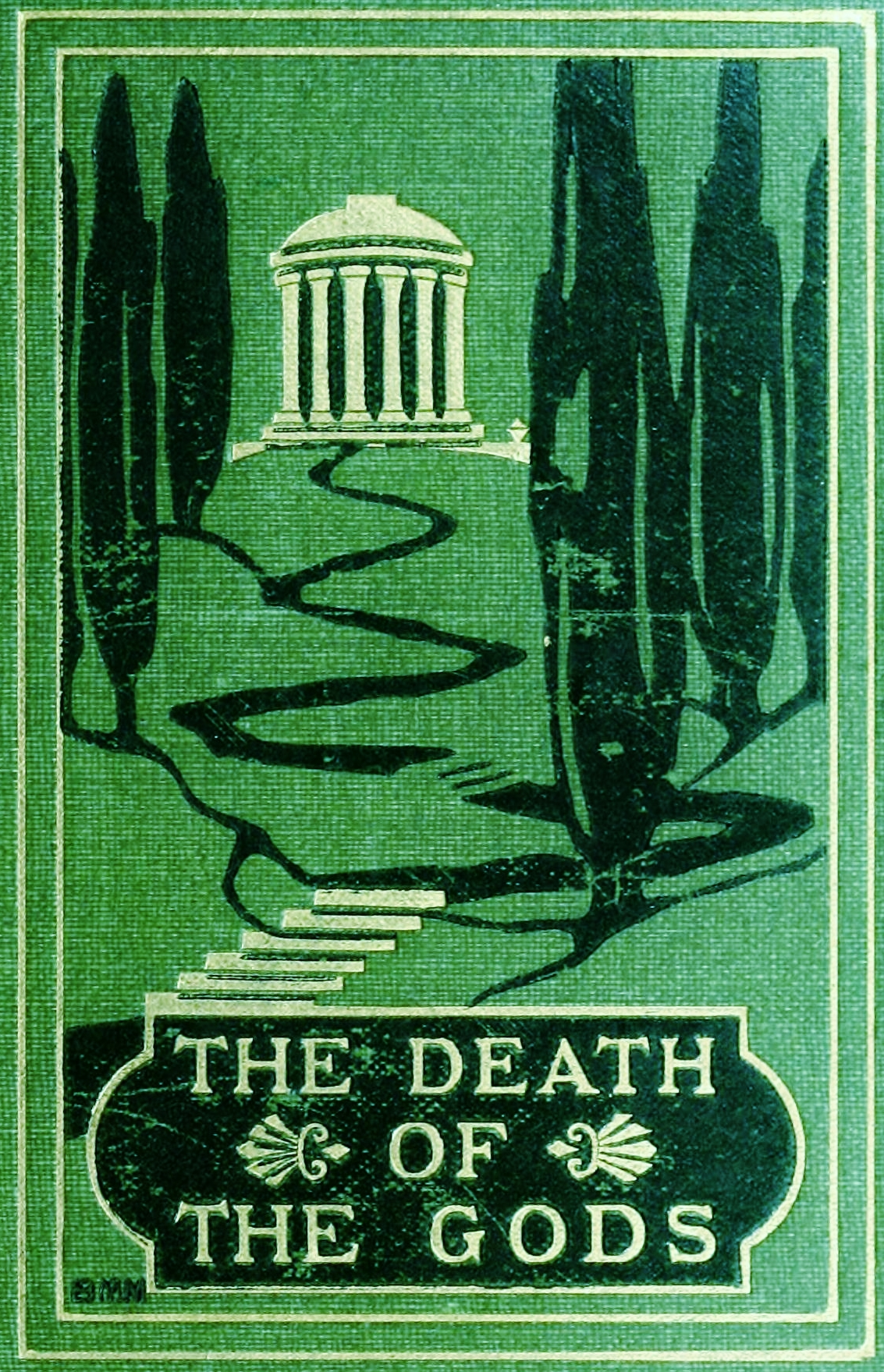
- Detail from the cover of the 1901 English translation
- Author: Dmitry Merezhkovsky
- Original title: Смерть богов. Юлиан Отступник
- Translator: Herbert Trench
- Language: Russian
- Publication date: 1895
- Publication place: Russia
- Media type: Print (Paperback & Hardback)

The Death of the Gods. Julian the Apostate (Russian: Смерть богов. Юлиан Отступник, romanized: Smert bogov. Yulian-Otstupnik) is a novel by Dmitry Merezhkovsky, first published (under the title The Outcast, Russian: Отверженный, romanized: Otverzhenny) in 1895 by Severny Vestnik. Exploring the theme of the 'two truths', those of Christianity and the Paganism, and developing Merezhkovsky's own religious theory of the Third Testament, it became the first in "The Christ and Antichrist" trilogy. The novel made Merezhkovsky a well-known author both in Russia and Western Europe though the initial response to it at home was indifferent.

== Background ==
Merezhkovsky started working on the novel in the summer of 1890. The process was boosted by the Merezhkovskys' 1892 journey abroad, where the couple visited Greece and Turkey. Merezhkovsky’s first impressions of Greece were not favourable, but everything changed as he found himself facing the sacred hill of Acropolis.

One glance for me was enough to see everything – Acropol, Parthenon, Propylaea and be overwhelmed by the feeling that will stay with me till my dying day. The joy poured into my soul, that of this instant escape from life that Beauty provides us. Pathetic worries over money, the unbearable heat, the tiredness from the journey, the weight of modern day petty skepticism – all this evapourised. Bewildered, almost out of my mind, I was standing there, repeating again and again: My God, what is that? [...] And, as always happened in the most significant, singular moments of my life, I received this impression that all this I've seen and lived through, not by books. I was staring and remembering all those things that were familiar and close to my heart. [...] For the first time in my life I understood what Beauty was. Without any prevailing idea or a wish, neither crying nor rejoicing, I just stood there, feeling very calm.

Upon returning, the couple found themselves in serious financial difficulties. "We literally have nothing to eat and we've pawned our wedding rings", Zinaida Gippius complained in one of her 1894 letters. Stricken by poverty, Merezhkovsky still managed to finish the novel.

== History ==
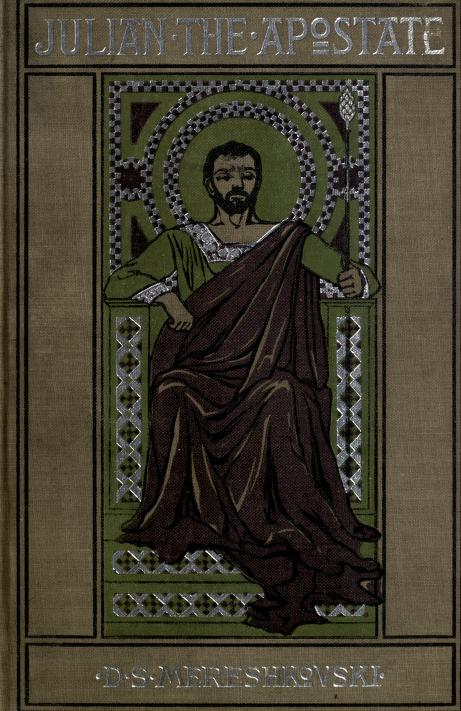
Book Cover (translation by Charles Johnson)

The Death of the Gods (according to Dina Magomedova) was "the first in a long series of Merezhkovsky's books rejected, violated by censors or confiscated by the police." When the novel was finished, none of the Russian magazines wanted to have anything to do with it, according to Gippius. In 1895, Severny Vestnik published it, but not in its original form and under another title, editor Akim Volynsky having subjected the text to major editing.

The one person who took Merezhkovsky's novel seriously was the Russian Literary Fund chairman Pyotr Veinberg. He started to invite the young author (now labeled "a decadent" by the press) to his prestigious literary parties. "One really should understand the atmosphere of the times to see how cheeky a venture this was. Merging the young writers with the old, Veinberg was making the public more and more tolerant to radical newcomers", Zinaida Gippius later remembered. Veinberg was the first of the old school of the Russian men of literature who fully supported the novel. He organized the public reading of it in his own house and thus helped it gain more support.

The novel enjoyed mass popularity and provoked heated debate. Even most ardent detractors (who were denouncing the young author as "a Nietzschean") had to acknowledge the merits of what turned out to be the first Symbolist novel in Russia: the profound knowledge of history and fine, subtle language. According to biographer Yuri Zobnin, this distinguished it from other Russian historical novels, set in the tradition started by Nikolay Danilevsky.

== The concept ==
The novel tells the story of Roman Emperor Julian who during his reign (361–363) was trying to restore the cult of Olympian gods in Rome, resisting the upcoming Christianity. Christianity "in its highest manifestations is presented in the novel as a cult of an absolute virtue, unattainable on Earth which is in denial of all things Earthly", according to scholar Z.G.Mints. Ascetic to the point of being inhuman, early Christians reject reality as such. As the mother of a Christian youth Juventine curses "those servants of the Crucified" who "tear children off their mothers", hate life itself and destroy "things that are great and saintly," the elder Didim replies: a worthy follower of Christ is to learn to "hate their mother and father, wife, children, brothers and sisters, and their very own life too."

The author (who sees Christ as "life's sworn enemy") sympathizes with his doomed hero. The advent of Christianity in the novel is presented as "the victory for evil and blind mob", who treat "Julian as not just an Apostate, but Antichrist", according to modern critic and biographer Oleg Mikhaylov. Biographers saw Julian's spiritual quest as something parallel to the ideas Merezhkovsky started to develop in the 1880s–1890s. The Emperor in the novel, acknowledging the "beautiful loftiness of Christian sermon", refuses to accept it, seeing it as a denial of the human sensuality and humanity as such.

One of the novel's main ideas is that man's suffering stems from the conflict between the spirit and the flesh. The author conceded later that his initial philosophical approach was too straightforward and explained the way it changed:

As I was embarking upon the trilogy Christ and Antichrist, it seemed to me that there were two truths: Christianity, the truth about Heaven, and Paganism, the truth about Earth. I considered the merging of the two as a way of attaining the higher religious truth. As I was finishing it, I knew already that the union of Christ and Antichrist was blasphemous lie. I understood that both truths, those of heaven and Earth, have been already united in Jesus Christ. But now I am also sure that I had to walk this misguiding path to its very end to finally see the truth.

Nevertheless, as later critics noted, every single one of Merezhkovsky's protagonists starting with Leonardo da Vinci, Peter the Great, Alexander I, were "spiritual twins" of Julian, seeking the harmonious unity of spirit and flesh here on Earth.

Of the novels's Nietzschean tendencies, philosopher Ivan Ilyin later wrote:

False things are declared true. True things exposed as false. Could this be dialectics? The norm is perverse, perversion is normal. There is a Christian girl who – out of sheer kindness – gives herself to stableman to be debauched. There is a Christian deacon, the altar priest, who puts on a mascara to look as a whore and enjoys dirty erotic adventures in circus. There is a crucifixion, the body of Christ, the head of an ass. There is a holy martyr who spits into the eyes of his executors, pronouncing unholy oaths. Christians who think only how to slaughter the non-Christians. Christ comes as equal to the pagan god Dionysius [...] Witchcraft here resembles the Christian prayer and a prayer sounds more like casting a magic spell. Is this Art? If it is, then it defies all the laws of art. Is it religion? More like godlessness.

== Adaptation ==
A Russian movie based on the novel, The Death of The Gods (1916 film), was released in 1916. It is considered a lost film.
