= Akim Volynsky =

Russian writer (1889–1925)

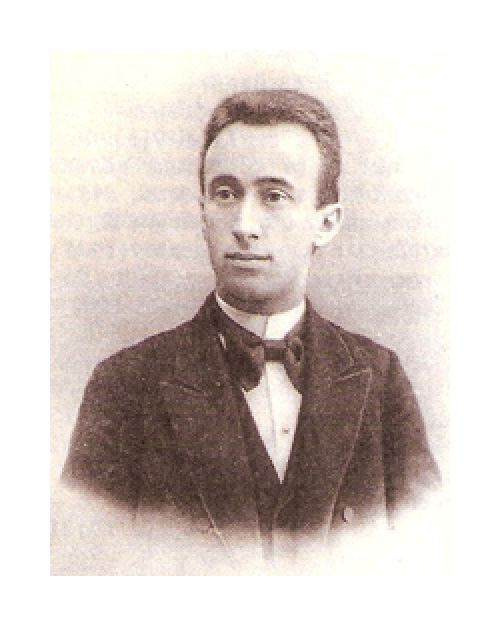
- Born: Хаим Лейбович Флексер; 3 May 1861; Zhitomir, Russian Empire
- Died: 6 July 1926 (aged 65); Leningrad, USSR
- Occupations: critic, essayist, literary administrator
- Years active: 1889–1925

Akim Lvovich Volynsky (Аким Львович Волынский, real name Khaim Leybovich Flekser, Хаим Лейбович Флексер; 3 May 1861 – 6 July 1926) was a Russian literary (later theatre and ballet) critic and historian, one of the early ideologists of the Russian Modernism.

== Early life ==
Born into a Jewish family, his identity would play a role in his future artistic endeavors.

== Career ==
Volynsky came to prominence during 1890 to 1895 with a series of essays published by Severny Vestnik magazine, of which he later became the co-editor. His 1896 book, Russian Critics, which targets figures like Nikolai Chernyshevsky and Nikolai Dobrolyubov, later in its turn evoked Georgy Plekhanov's scathing criticism. It was followed by another seminal compilation, Fighting for Idealism (Борьба за идеализм, 1900).

Among Volynsky's notable books are Leonardo da Vinchi (1900) and F.M. Dostoyevsky (1906); the former drew accusations of plagiarism, as Volynsky the editor has apparently used in it the materials collected by Dmitry Merezhkovsky.

After the 1917 Revolution, Volynsky stayed in the Soviet Russia. From 1920 to 1924, he was a chairman of the Leningrad section of the Writers' Union and for a while headed the Leningrad School of Choreography. His treatise Book of Joys. The Alphabet of the Classic Dance came out in 1925.
