= Valentin Ternavtsev =

- Born: Валентин Александрович Тернавцев; 27 February 1866; Melitopol, Russian Empire
- Died: 28 August 1940 (aged 74); Serpukhov, Moskovskaya Oblast
- Occupations: religious activist, author
- Known for: The Religious and Philosophical Society

Valentin Alexandrovich Ternavtsev (Russian: Валентин Александрович Тернавцев; 27 February 1866 in Melitopol, Tavria Governorate, Russian Empire (modern Ukraine) – 28 August 1940 in Serpukhov, Moskovskaya Oblast, USSR) was a Russian author, publisher and religious activist, one of the organisers of the Religious and Philosophical Society (1901-1903). A high-ranking Synod official in 1906-1917, Ternavtsev had the reputation of an active reformist in the Russian Orthodox Church hierarchy.
