= 1895 in literature =

This article contains information about the literary events and publications of 1895.

== Events ==
- January – The Ottoman illustrated magazine Servet-i Fünun is taken over by Tevfik Fikret, who turns it into a vehicle for Edebiyat-ı Cedide ("New Literature"). These writers are committed to conservatism and Ottomanism, rather than Turkish nationalism, but also favor Westernization. They use a "recondite and obscure" Ottoman language within the framework of aestheticism.
- January–May – H. G. Wells' first "scientific romance", the novella The Time Machine, is published serially in The New Review (London). The first book editions are published by the Henry Holt and Company in New York on May 7 and by Heinemann in London on May 29.

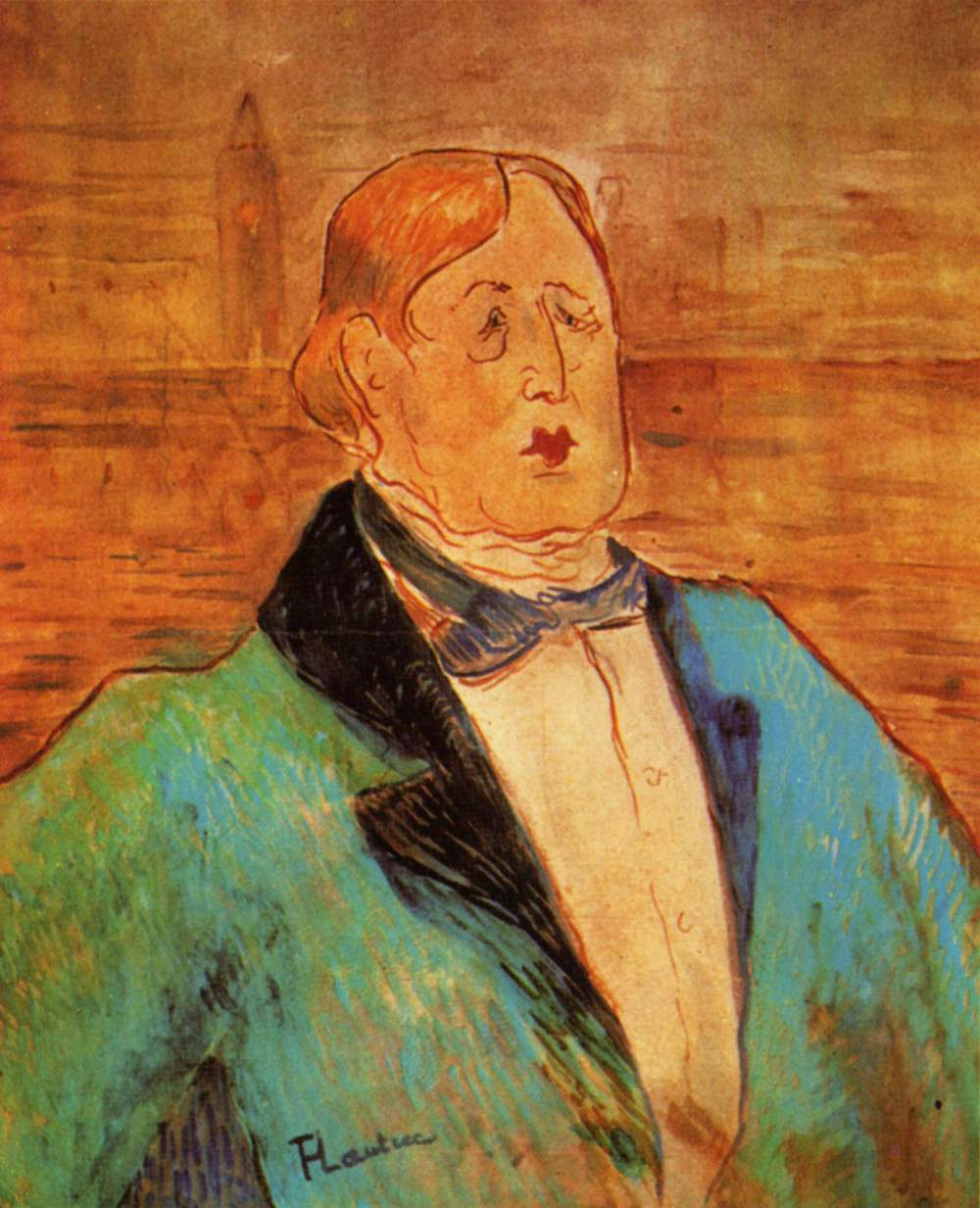
Toulouse-Lautrec's portrait of Oscar Wilde on the night before his trial opens

- January 3 – The première of Oscar Wilde's comedy An Ideal Husband takes place at the Haymarket Theatre in London.
- January 5
  - The première of Henry James's historical drama Guy Domville held at St James's Theatre in London is booed.
  - A. E. Waite ceases to publish and edit his occult periodical The Unknown World.
- January 12 – The National Trust for Places of Historic Interest or Natural Beauty is registered in England and begins acquiring properties and making them accessible to the public. Carlyle's House in Chelsea is one of the first to open.
- February – The Bookman (New York), a monthly, is first published by Dodd, Mead and Company with Harry Thurston Peck as editor. It publishes the first bestseller list, which is headed by Frank R. Stockton's novel The Adventures of Captain Horn.
- February 14 – Oscar Wilde's last play, the comedy The Importance of Being Earnest, opens at St James's Theatre, London.
- February 18 – The Marquess of Queensberry (father of Lord Alfred Douglas, Oscar Wilde's lover), leaves a calling card at the Albemarle Club in London inscribed: "For Oscar Wilde, posing somdomite", i. e. sodomite, inducing Wilde to charge him with criminal libel. In a meeting on March 25 at the Café Royal in London, Frank Harris and George Bernard Shaw fail to dissuade Wilde from proceeding with the action.
- March 4 – George du Maurier's play, Trilby, based on his novel of the same name, serialised in 1894 and first published in book form in 1895, opens at the Boston Museum in the United States, with a New York première on April 15 at the Garden Theatre. Wilton Lackaye plays Svengali and Virginia Harned the title rôle.
- April/May – Pan, a German arts and literary magazine, is first published, in Berlin.
- April 3–5 – Queensberry is acquitted in the libel case of Wilde v Queensberry at the Old Bailey in London. Evidence of Wilde's homosexual relationships with young men renders him liable to criminal prosecution under the Labouchere Amendment, while the Libel Act 1843 renders him legally liable for the considerable expenses Queensberry has incurred in his defence, leaving Wilde penniless.
- April 6 – Oscar Wilde is arrested at the Cadogan Hotel, London, in the company of Robbie Ross, for "unlawfully committing acts of gross indecency with certain male persons". He is detained on remand in Holloway Prison.
- April 29 – Joseph Conrad's novel Almayer's Folly is published in London by T. Fisher Unwin, as Conrad's first published work, after retirement from his career at sea. It marks the first appearance of his pseudonym.
- May 23 – Representatives of the Astor Library and Lenox Library, with the backing of Samuel J. Tilden, agree to merge and form the New York Public Library.
- May 25
  - After a retrial of the criminal case of Regina v. Wilde at the Old Bailey, Oscar Wilde is convicted of gross indecency and taken to Pentonville Prison to begin a two-year sentence of hard labour. In June he requests to read in his cell Pater's The Renaissance, Augustine's Confessions and works by Baudelaire and Newman. On November 21 he is transferred to Reading Gaol.
  - Henry Irving becomes the first English actor to be knighted as such.
- June 21 – William Poel's newly formed Elizabethan Stage Society, created to promote productions of plays by Shakespeare and his contemporaries in the assumed style of the English Renaissance theatre, gives its first performance, at Burlington Hall.
- September 7 – The stage version of Trilby (see March 4) has its UK première at the Theatre Royal, Manchester, with a London première on October 30 at the Haymarket Theatre), with Herbert Beerbohm Tree and Dorothea Baird. The play is so successful that Tree can use the profits to build Her Majesty's Theatre. It also popularises the trilby hat.
- October
  - The American Historical Review appears for the first time.
  - Stephen Crane's American Civil War novel The Red Badge of Courage is first published in an abridged book format by D. Appleton & Company in New York.
  - Rudyard Kipling publishes the story "Mowgli Leaves the Jungle Forever" in The Cosmopolitan illustrated magazine in the United States, concluding the series collected in The Second Jungle Book, published in England in November.
- November 1 – Thomas Hardy's last completed novel, Jude the Obscure, is published by Osgood, McIlvaine, and Co. in London, dated 1896, on completion of an expurgated serialization under the title Hearts Insurgent in Harper's Magazine. It is strongly criticized on moral grounds. Hardy later claims that Walsham How, Bishop of Wakefield, burned a copy.
- c. December – Ioseb Besarionis dze Jughashvili, the future Joseph Stalin, publishes his romantic poems in the newspaper Iveria, receiving accolades from a senior writer, Ilia Chavchavadze.
- December 19 – Robert Frost marries Elinor Miriam White at Lawrence, Massachusetts.
- unknown dates
  - Abdallah bin Hemedi bin Ali Ajjemy's Habari za Wakilindi is the first novel to be published in the Swahili language.
  - Castello Holford's utopian novel Aristopia: A Romance-History of the New World, appears in Boston as the first full-length alternate history in English.
  - Ernest Thayer recites Casey at the Bat at a Harvard class reunion, appearing to resolve a mystery about the poem's authorship.
  - The first edition of the Times Atlas of the World is published at the office of The Times newspaper in London.
  - Hall Caine travels in the United States and Canada, representing the U.K. Society of Authors. He obtains international copyright concessions from the Dominion Parliament.

== New books ==
=== Fiction ===
- Grant Allen
  - The British Barbarians
  - The Woman Who Did
- John Kendrick Bangs – A House-Boat on the Styx
- Mary Elizabeth Braddon – Sons of Fire
- Rhoda Broughton – Scylla or Charybdis?
- Robert W. Chambers – The King in Yellow
- Anton Chekhov – "Three Years"
- Joseph Conrad – Almayer's Folly
- Marie Corelli – The Sorrows of Satan
- Stephen Crane – The Red Badge of Courage
- Victoria Crosse – The Woman Who Didn't
- Grazia Deledda – Anime oneste (Honest soul)
- Ménie Muriel Dowie – Gallia
- Alice Dunbar – Violets and Other Tales (short stories and poetry)
- Isabelle Eberhardt as Nicolas Podolinsky – "Infernalia" (short story)
- J. Meade Falkner – The Lost Stradivarius
- Antonio Fogazzaro – The Little World of the Past (Piccolo mondo antico)
- Ludwig Ganghofer – Hubertus Castle
- Hamlin Garland – Rose of Dutcher's Coolly
- George Gissing
  - Eve's Ransom
  - The Paying Guest
  - Sleeping Fires
- Thomas Hardy – Jude the Obscure
- Robert Hichens – An Imaginative Man
- Castello Holford – Aristopia
- William Wilson Hunter – The Old Missionary (book publication)
- Joris-Karl Huysmans – En Route
- Henry James – Terminations (collection)
- Olha Kobylianska – Tsarivna (Princess)
- John Uri Lloyd – Etidorhpa, or, the end of the earth: the strange history of a mysterious being and the account of a remarkable journey
- George MacDonald – Lilith
- Ian Maclaren – The Days of Auld Lang Syne
- George Meredith – The Amazing Marriage
- Dmitry Merezhkovsky – The Death of the Gods
- Kálmán Mikszáth – St. Peter's Umbrella (Szent Péter esernyője)
- Arthur Morrison – Chronicles of Martin Hewitt
- Henrik Pontoppidan – Det forjættede Land (The Promised Land; publication concludes)
- Gustavus W. Pope – Journey to Venus
- Bolesław Prus – Pharaoh (Faraon; serialization begins)
- Emilio Salgari – I misteri della 8jungla nera
- Henryk Sienkiewicz – Quo Vadis
- Leo Tolstoy – Master and Man (Хозяин и работник)
- Jules Verne – Propeller Island (L'Île à hélice)
- H. G. Wells – The Time Machine

=== Children and young people ===
- Lewis Carroll – Sylvie and Bruno
- G. E. Farrow – The Wallypug of Why
- Ellen Thorneycroft Fowler – The Young Pretenders (reissued 2007)
- Rudyard Kipling
  - The Brushwood Boy
  - The Second Jungle Book
- L. T. Meade – A Princess of the Gutter
- Mary Louisa Molesworth (Mrs. Molesworth) – The Carved Lions
- Emilio Salgari – I Misteri della Jungla Nera (The Mystery of the Black Jungle – first in the Sandokan series of eleven books)
- Florence Kate Upton – The Adventures of Two Dutch Dolls and a Golliwogg
- Alice Zimmern – Greek History for Young Readers

=== Drama ===
- Tristan Bernard – Les Pieds nickelés
- Hall Caine with Louis N. Parker – The Manxman (as Pete)
- Henry Guy Carleton – Ambition
- Joaquín Dicenta – Juan José
- José Echegaray – El estigma
- Sidney R. Ellis – Bonnie Scotland
- Hulda Garborg – Mødre
- Alfred Jarry – Caesar Antichrist
- Maurice Maeterlinck – Interior (Intérieur, verse play for marionettes, first production)
- Jules Renard – La Demande
- Arthur Schnitzler – Liebelei
- Tsubouchi Shōyō (坪内 逍遥) – Kiri Hitoha (A Paulownia Leaf, writing complete)
- Frank Wedekind – Earth Spirit
- Oscar Wilde – The Importance of Being Earnest

=== Poetry ===
- Pauline Johnson – The White Wampum
- Giovanni Marradi – Ballati moderne
- Banjo Paterson – The Man from Snowy River and Other Verses
- See also 1895 in poetry

=== Non-fiction ===
- Lord Acton – A Lecture on the Study of History
- Josef Breuer and Sigmund Freud – Studies on Hysteria (Studien über Hysterie)
- Anton Chekhov – " Sakhalin Island"
- Francis Darwin – The Elements of Botany
- Annetta Seabury Dresser – The Philosophy of P. P. Quimby
- Gustave Le Bon – Psychologie des foules (Psychology of Crowds)
- Friedrich Nietzsche – Der Antichrist (written 1888)

== Births ==
- January 24 – Eugen Roth, German poet and lyricist (died 1976)
- February 14 – Max Horkheimer, German philosopher (died 1973)
- February 28 – Marcel Pagnol, French novelist (died 1974)
- March 29 – Ernst Jünger, German novelist (died 1998)
- April 15 – Corrado Alvaro, Italian novelist and journalist (died 1968)
- April 17 – Ion Vinea, Romanian poet and novelist (died 1964)
- April 20 – Henry de Montherlant, French novelist and dramatist (suicide 1972)
- April 23 – Ngaio Marsh, New Zealand detective fiction writer and theatre director (died 1982)
- May 3 – Ernst Kantorowicz, German historian (died 1963)
- May 8 – Edmund Wilson, American literary critic (died 1972)
- May 9 – Lucian Blaga, Romanian poet and philosopher (died 1961)
- May 11 – Jiddu Krishnamurti, Indian philosopher, speaker, and writer (died 1986)
- May 19 – Charles Sorley, Scottish-born poet (killed in action 1915)
- May 24 – Marcel Janco, Romanian–Israeli artist, art theorist, essayist and poet (died 1984)
- June 16 – Warren Lewis, Irish-born historian (died 1973)
- June 27 – Anna Banti, Italian art historian, critic, and translator (died 1985)
- June 29 – Alice Lardé de Venturino, Salvadoran poet and writer (died 1983)
- July 14 – F. R. Leavis, English literary critic (died 1978)
- July 24 – Robert Graves, English poet and novelist (died 1985)
- August 19 – Arnolt Bronnen, Austrian playwright and director (died 1959)
- September 2 – D. I. Suchianu, Romanian essayist, translator, social scientist and film theorist (died 1985)
- September 7 – Jacques Vaché, French writer and magazine editor (died 1919)
- September 16 – Zainal Abidin Ahmad, Malayan nationalist writer (died 1973)
- September 21 – Sergei Yesenin, Russian poet (died 1925)
- October 3 – Giovanni Comisso, Italian writer (died 1969)
- October 6 – Caroline Gordon, American novelist and critic (died 1981)
- October 17 – C. H. B. Kitchin, English novelist (died 1967)
- October 20 – Alexandru Rosetti, Romanian linguist, editor and memoirist (died 1990)
- October 31 – B. H. Liddell Hart, English military historian (died 1970)
- November 1 – David Jones, Anglo-Welsh poet and artist (died 1974)
- November 16 – Michael Arlen, Armenian novelist and short story writer (died 1956)
- December 1 – Henry Williamson, English novelist (died 1977)
- December 9 – Vivian de Sola Pinto, English poet, literary critic, and historian (died 1969)
- December 14 – Paul Éluard, French poet (died 1952)
- December 24 – Noel Streatfeild, English novelist and children's writer (died 1986)
- December 28 – Carol Ryrie Brink, American novelist and children's author (died 1981)
- Unknown date – Ionel Gherea, Romanian philosopher, essayist and novelist (died 1978)

== Deaths ==
- January 3 – Mary Torrans Lathrap, American author and reformer (born 1838)
- January 13 – John Robert Seeley, English historian and essayist (born 1834)
- January 15 – Lady Charlotte Guest, English translator of Welsh literature (born 1812)
- February 16 – Camilla Dufour Crosland, English writer and poet (born 1812)
- February 19 – Auguste Vacquerie, French journalist (born 1819)
- February 20 – Frederick Douglass, African-American abolitionist, orator and writer (born 1818)
- March 5 – Nikolai Leskov, Russian journalist, novelist and short story writer (born 1831)
- March 15 – Cesare Cantù, Italian historian (born 1804)
- March 22 – Henry Coppée, American historian and biographer (born 1821)
- April 3 – Gustav Freytag, German novelist and dramatist (born 1816)
- April 17 – Jorge Isaacs, Colombian writer, politician and explorer (born 1837)
- April 25 – Emily Thornton Charles, American newspaper founder (born 1845)
- April 26 – Eric Stenbock, German poet (born 1858)
- May 4 – Lillian Spender (née Headland), English novelist (born 1835)
- May 26 – Ahmet Cevdet Pasha, Ottoman historian and legal writer (born 1822)
- June 27 – Sophie Adlersparre, Swedish feminist and magazine editor (born 1823)
- August 1 – Heinrich von Sybel, German historian (born 1817)
- August 5 – Friedrich Engels, German socialist writer (born 1820)
- September 29 – William Grainge, English local historian (born 1818)
- October 14 – Clara Doty Bates, American author (born 1838)
- November 4 – Eugene Field, American children's author (born 1850)
- November 27 – Alexandre Dumas, fils, French novelist and dramatist (born 1824)
- November 28 – L. S. Bevington, English anarchist poet and essayist (born 1845)
