= Ionia (novel) =

1898 novel by Alexander Craig

Ionia: Land of Wise Men and Fair Women
- Title page for Ionia: Land of Wise Men and Fair Women (1898)
- Author: Alexander Craig
- Illustrator: J. C. Leyendecker
- Language: English
- Genre: Utopian fiction Science fiction Speculative fiction Lost world fiction
- Publisher: E. A. Weeks Co.
- Publication date: 1898
- Publication place: United States
- Media type: Print (Hardcover)
- Pages: 301

Ionia: Land of Wise Men and Fair Women is an 1898 utopian novel written by Alexander Craig. It is one work in the major wave of utopian and dystopian fiction that characterized the final decades of the nineteenth century and the start of the twentieth.

Virtually nothing is known of the book's author, Alexander Craig. Though his novel was published in the United States, the story has a strong English setting and ambience. It is known, from the dedication page, the Author dedicated the book to Nahum Edward Jennison. The book was published by E.A. Weeks Co. The illustrations for the book are by J.C. Leyendecker. His design for the dustjacket is considered an early example of the poster style dustjacket.

== Synopsis ==
A London banker named David Musgrave dies prematurely in his mid-fifties, leaving a large fortune to his young wife and small son. The widow devotes her money, time, and energy to improving her home village in Surrey. She educates her son, Alexander Musgrave, to be generous and idealistic; when he comes into his majority and his own fortune, the younger Musgrave devotes himself to a philanthropic enterprise in a London parish. In the course of that work, he meets an impressive man named Jason Delphion, who seems to exist on a level of physical and intellectual development superior to average human beings.

Delphion, an admirer of Musgrave's philanthropic efforts, tells the young Englishman about a hidden country in the remote Himalayas where an ideal and utopian society has evolved. Delphion invites Musgrave to visit the country, and Musgrave is eager to do so. They travel to northern India, and from there they fly, via Ionian aircraft, to the secret valley. Musgrave learns that the people are largely Greek in origin, descended from a cohort of seven thousand ancient Greek mercenaries who served the Persian Empire, and who fled eastward after the victories of Alexander the Great. The Greeks established themselves in their Himalayan valley, and for many generations lived as farmers, herders, and mercenaries in the armies of Indian princes. At the time of the Mughal Empire, a local prince named Timoleon travelled to Europe and brought back knowledge and technology; he led the Ionians in their development of an advanced and deliberately isolated culture.

The travelers land at Iolkos, the Ionian capital, where the buildings are "palatial halls" with "towers and domes," constructed of marble in varying shades. The government is headquartered on an Acropolis, built on an island in the valley's main lake. (Craig's description of the Acropolis of Iolkos, with palaces divided by canals surrounding a "central basin" in which is set a great statue, recalls the Court of Honor at the World's Columbian Exposition in Chicago in 1893, the famous "White City.") The language of the Ionians remains Greek, and the country's main rivers are the Pharos and the Styx. The people are well-educated (university training is common for all), and rational in their dress, manners, and customs.

Musgrave finds that the Ionians have created a technology based on electricity, drawn from windmills and from the Earth's magnetic field. Electricity powers their land vehicles and aircraft, and lights and heats their homes and cities. Their most common metal is aluminum. They irrigate their valley into a lush agricultural garden; all the land is owned by the state. Their government is a republic, under an elected archon; the state controls marriage and practices eugenics, and the people generally live to be one hundred years old. Inherited wealth is limited, and poverty is unknown. The Ionians run their commerce and manufacturing along highly rational and organized lines, with no debt or advertising; they control pollution and recycle waste.

Musgrave is awed and amazed by life in Ionia, and quickly becomes a convert to its values. He leaves the country after a stay of several months, though; he is determined to bring Ionian advances to England and the rest of the world.

== Linkages ==
Ionia shares some ideas and concepts with other utopian novels of its era, elements that were part of the general intellectual atmosphere of its generation. In Craig's arrangement of commercial matters, expenses of interest payments and advertising are nonexistent, and workers own shares in the companies that employ them — traits also found in Bradford Peck's novel The World a Department Store (1900). In Ionia, all land is owned by the state and leased to businesses and private citizens, as in Byron Brooks's Earth Revisited (1892) and Castello Holford's Aristopia (1895).

== Ionian aircraft ==
Craig's novel belongs to a subgenre of speculative fiction that might be called "airplane fiction". A number of novels of the later nineteenth century looked forward to the invention of powered flight. Craig gives a description of what he imagines such an aircraft might be like.

Musgrave and Delphion fly to the hidden valley in a craft shaped "like an enormous egg, at least twenty feet long," with portholes around its circumference and larger windows at one end. On the ground it rests on four metal struts. The upper portion of the craft is devoted to a gas compartment full of hydrogen, which aids in lift. The craft has a fan-like "elevator" for vertical motion and a "propeller" for horizontal; once airborne it deploys a variety of masts and sails that aid in steering.

Musgrave soon learns that the Ionians possess much larger craft built along the same lines. Some decades before the time of his visit, an Ionian air fleet reached the North Pole, on an expedition in which half the aircraft, six out of twelve, needed to be abandoned (though their crews were rescued).

Some works of "airplane fiction" unite development of the airplane with eventual exploration of outer space. Craig does not go quite that far, though he does permit himself a literary gesture in that direction. As the Ionian aircraft flies toward the valley, the pilot shuts off the lights so that Musgrave can see the stars. At a high elevation in the clear mountain air, Musgrave is overwhelmed by their brilliance, each a blazing "orb of regal splendor," and he is awed by the knowledge that each is a "distant sun."

Musgrave later learns that the astronomy of the Ionians is so advanced that they have discovered a planetary system around Sirius.

== Harsh laws ==
The Ionians of Craig's fiction have virtually eliminated crime from their society — through extreme severity of punishment. Felons are penalized with castration for the first offense, and for the second, execution.

Craig's ideal world is also marred by overt anti-Semitism. In the story, the valley once had a small Jewish community, but they abused their wealth and power, and plotted the assassination of one unsympathetic archon. The leaders of the Jewish community were executed, and the Jews in general were forbidden to marry and reproduce, so that the community died out.

Scholar and critic Jean Pfaelzer has employed the term "conservative utopias" for a particular sub-class of the relevant literature: while the majority of utopian works of the later nineteenth century embraced liberal or socialist values, others, written in reaction to those books, advocated conservative and even reactionary views and policies. (John Macnie's The Diothas provides some examples of this tendency, as does Addison Peale Russell's Sub-Coelum.) Craig's work has a number of conservative and reactionary aspects, including: strong state control over people's private lives, including personal choices of marriage and reproduction; limited individual liberty; and some specific views of extreme intolerance and insensitivity (such as the view that ugly women should not have, and should not want to have, children).

== See also ==
- Lost Horizon by James Hilton
