= Romp =

Romp or ROMP may refer to:

- IBM ROMP, a microprocessor
- Ring opening metathesis polymerization, an olefin polymerization method
- Romps (1885), a series of tales illustrated by Harry Furniss
- The Romp (play) (1767), a comedic afterpiece play derived from Love in the City by Isaac Bickerstaffe
- The Romp (website) (also known as Romp.com), a Los Angeles-based entertainment website
- Bert Romp (1958–2018), Dutch equestrian and Olympic champion

== See also ==
- "Romp in a Swamp", the 94th animated cartoon short subject in the Woody Woodpecker series
- Streamliner Coaster, a junior roller coaster at Six Flags Fiesta Texas (formerly named "Romp Bomp A Stomp")
- International Bluegrass Music Museum, a bluegrass music museum with an annual summer music festival titled ROMP (originally designating River Of Music Party)
