= List of 19th-century British children's literature authors =

List of authors of 19th-century British children's literature, arranged by year of birth:

- Eliza Fenwick (1767–1840) ^{†}
- Barbara Hofland (1770–1844)
- George Walker (1772–1847) ^{†}
- Mary Martha Sherwood (1775–1851)
- Alicia Catherine Mant (1788–1869)
- Frederick Marryat (1792–1848) ^{†}
- Charlotte Anley (1796–1893) ^{†}
- Catherine Sinclair (1800–1864)
- Anna Maria Hall (1800–1881)
- Catherine Crowe (1803–1876) ^{†}
- W. H. G. Kingston (1814–1880)
- Elizabeth Missing Sewell (1815–1906)
- Charles Kingsley (1819–1875) ^{†}
- Anna Sewell (1820–1878)
- Jean Ingelow (1820–1897) ^{†}
- Charlotte Maria Tucker (1821–1893)
- Thomas Hughes (1822–1896)
- Charlotte Mary Yonge (1823–1901) ^{†}
- William Brighty Rands (1823–1882) ^{†}
- George MacDonald (1824–1905) ^{†}
- Anna Harriet Drury (1824–1912) ^{†}
- Annie Keary (1825–1879)
- Robert Michael Ballantyne (1825–1894)
- Dinah Craik (1826–1887)
- Frederic W. Farrar (1831–1909)
- Lewis Carroll (1832–1898) ^{†}
- G. A. Henty (1832–1902) ^{†}
- Hesba Stretton (1832–1911)
- Emilia Marryat (1835–1875)
- Frances Mary Peard (1835–1923) ^{†}
- Frank Atha Westbury (1838–1901) ^{†}
- Mary Louisa Molesworth (1839–1921)
- Sarah Doudney (1841–1926) ^{†}
- Juliana Horatia Ewing (1842–1885)
- Christabel Rose Coleridge (1843–1921)
- Andrew Lang (1844–1912) ^{†}
- Evelyn Whitaker (1844–1929)
- Georgina Castle Smith (1845–1933)
- Agnes Giberne (1845–1939)
- Blanche Atkinson (1847–1911) ^{†}
- Flora Annie Steel (1847–1929) ^{†}
- Richard Jefferies (1848–1887)
- Amy Catherine Walton (1849–1939)
- Frances Hodgson Burnett (1849-1924)
- Robert Louis Stevenson (1850–1894) ^{†}
- Talbot Baines Reed (1852–1893)
- L. T. Meade (1854–1914)
- Evelyn Everett-Green (1856–1932)
- E. Nesbit (1858–1924)
- E. E. Cowper (1859–1933) ^{†}
- Ellen Thorneycroft Fowler (1860–1929) ^{†}
- Herbert Hayens (1861–1944)
- G. E. Farrow (1862–1919)
- Rudyard Kipling (1865–1936) ^{†}
- Mrs Henry de la Pasture (1866–1945) ^{†}
