= The Wallypug of Why =

1895 novel by G. E. Farrow

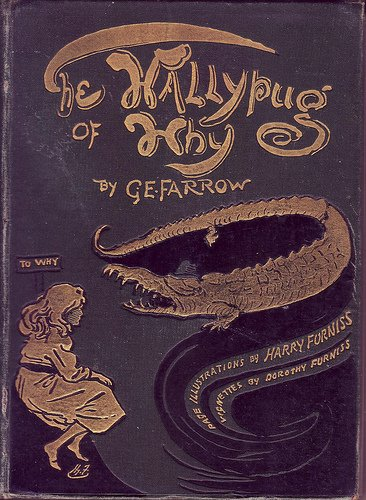
- Author: G. E. Farrow
- Illustrator: Harry Furniss; Dorothy Furniss
- Language: English
- Genre: Children's novel
- Publisher: Hutchinson & Co.
- Publication date: 1895
- Publication place: United Kingdom
- Media type: Print (Hardcover)
- Pages: 201 pp.

The Wallypug of Why is an 1895 children's novel by G. E. Farrow. The book is an exercise in humorous nonsense, rich in wordplay and absurd situations, in the tradition of Lewis Carroll's Alice's Adventures in Wonderland. A popular success, it inaugurated a series of Wallypug sequels.

The Wallypug of Why was Farrow's first book. It was well received by the reviewers who likened it to Alice's Adventures in Wonderland, and was enthusiastically received by its child readers, if we are to accept at face value the author's comments in the prefaces to his subsequent books. The Wallypug of Why undeniably owes a great deal to Lewis Carroll. In the latter decades of the 19th century there were many Alice imitations, many of them very close to the original. Of these imitators Farrow is easily the best, and also the most prolific. The Wallypug is a genuinely original and endearing character, a "nervous little nonentity who in theory rules the land of Why, but in practice is ruled by his subjects whom he addresses as 'Your Majesty.' Harry Furniss's drawings of the Wallypug with his crown tipped over one eye caught the character so well that other illustrators who worked on the Wallypug sequels copied the Furniss interpretation.

The Wallypug of Why is rich in nonsense and absurd situations and it humorously depicts life in late-Victorian times. The novel's protagonist, known only as Girlie, finds a letter written home by her youngest brother (known only as Boy). The letter protrudes slightly from its envelope, and Girlie is able to read the following:

I have found a goo

Rather than extract the letter from its envelope and read it completely, Girlie pauses to wonder what a "goo" might be — which leads to a chain of fantastic events.

She visits the land of Why, regarded as the source of all questions and answers, where the Wallypug is king. It is described as a topsy-turvy place: the Wallypug must address all the citizens as 'Your Majesty' and do what people tell him to do. Many of the residents are talking animals with curious habits and quirks of personality — including a "socialistic cockatoo."

The book was illustrated by Harry Furniss, who had collaborated with Lewis Carroll on Sylvie and Bruno (1889) and Sylvie and Bruno Concluded (1893). It was provided with vignettes by Dorothy Furniss (1879–1944), Furniss's 15-year-old daughter.
