= Tottles =

Fictional literary character

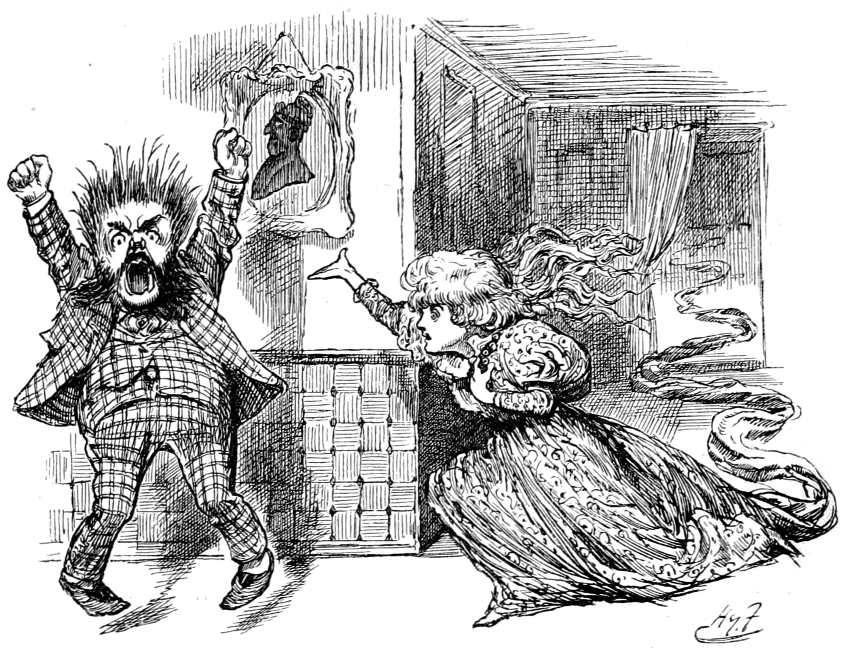
"'Never!' yelled Tottles". Illustration by Harry Furniss (1854–1925) for Beyond these Voices, Chapter 16 of Sylvie and Bruno Concluded (1893).

Tottles was a character in a poem from Lewis Carroll's novel Sylvie and Bruno Concluded (1893), the second volume following on from Sylvie and Bruno (1889). The poem What Tottles Meant is recited in Chapter 13. The poem recounts how the newlywed Mr. Tottles is impoverished by trying to keep up with his mother-in-law's expectations. His name echoes the Victorian slang tottle, a facetious mispronunciation of total, meaning a bill from a restaurant or tradesman.

Tottles the Bear, with a name derived from the Lewis Carroll character, is a fictional bear who features in children's stories. He was originated by Humphry Bowen. He has a girlfriend called Tutu and a best friend called Tuttles.

A book by Gina Hughes entitled Tommy Tottlebears Days Before Christmas was published in 2000.

== See also ==
- Tootles, one of the lost boys in Peter Pan by J. M. Barrie (1904)
