= 1898 in literature =

This article contains information about the literary events and publications of 1898.

== Events ==
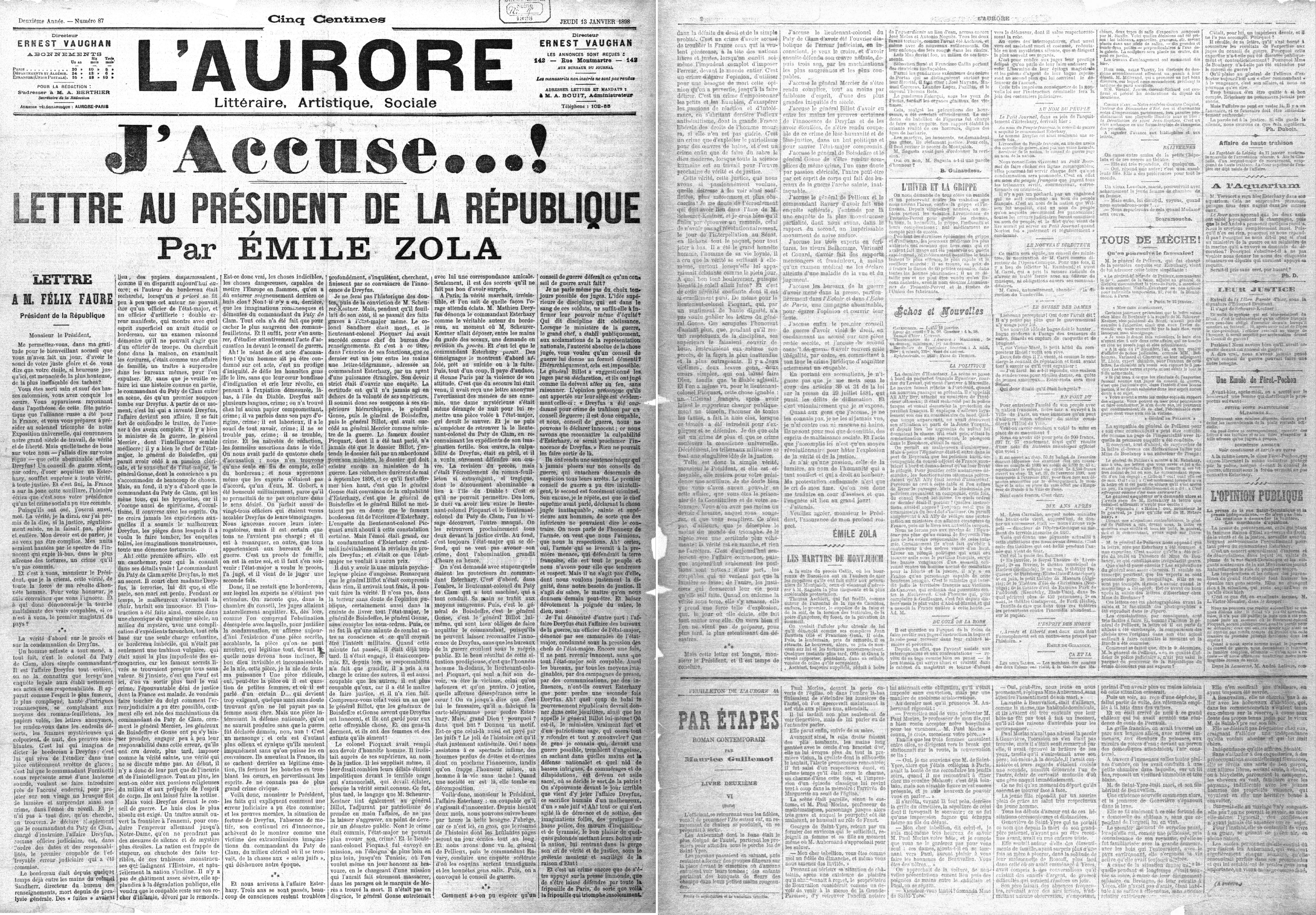
J'Accuse...!: the first page of Zola's letter

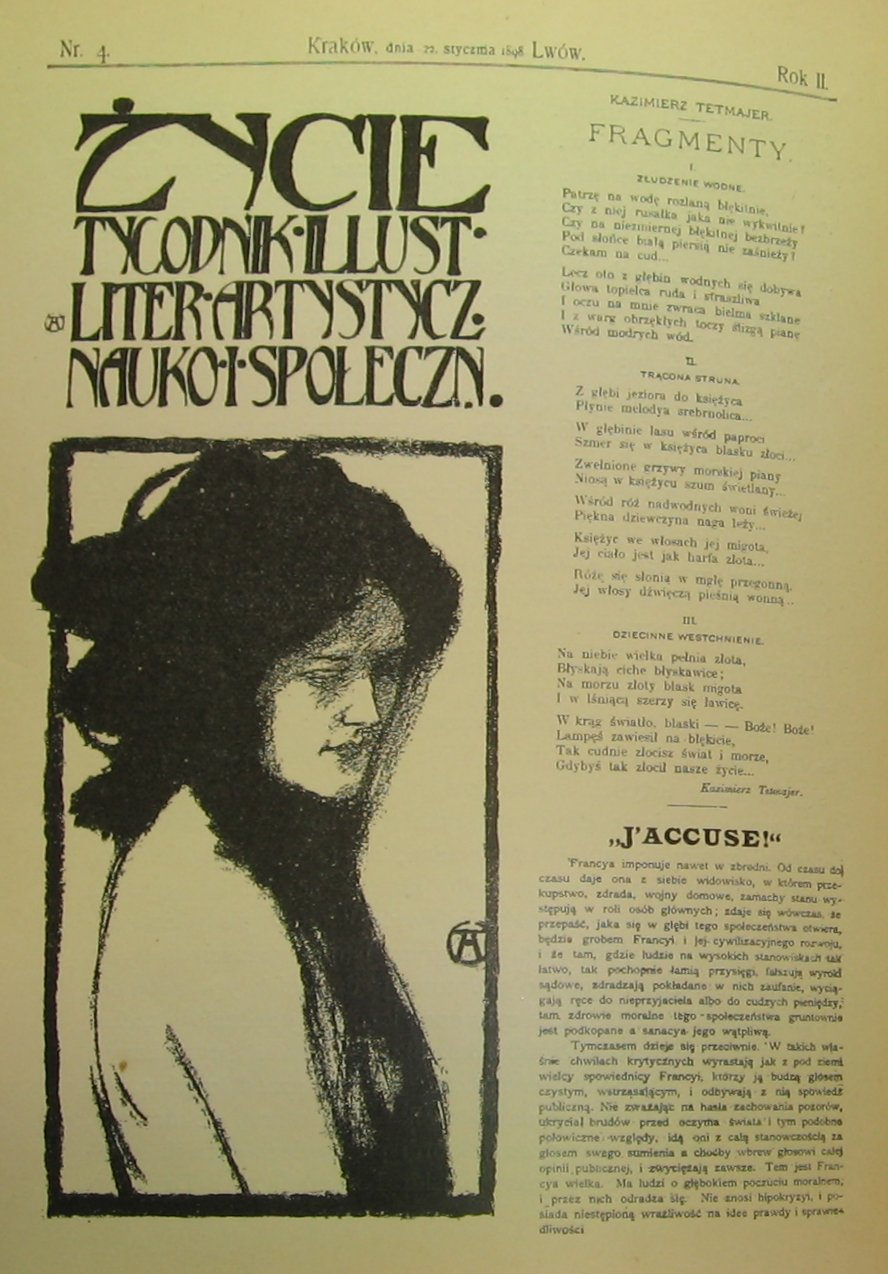
Edition of the Polish Życie reporting on Zola's letter and the Dreyfus affair

- January 13 – Émile Zola's open letter to Félix Faure, President of France, on the Dreyfus affair, J'Accuse...!, is published on the front page of the Paris daily newspaper L'Aurore. On February 23, Zola is convicted of criminal libel in connection with J'Accuse...!. Following the dismissal of his appeal, Zola flees to London (arriving on July 19) to escape imprisonment. In August, he begins writing his novel Fécondité in the suburbs.
- February 5–June 18 – M. P. Shiel's "Yellow Peril" novel The Empress of the Earth, written around contemporary events in China, appears in the Pearson weekly Short Stories (London) and in book form in July as The Yellow Danger; it is frequently reprinted.
- February 25 – Première of Frank Wedekind's Earth Spirit (Erdgeist), first of his Lulu plays, in Leipzig, in a production by Carl Heine, with Wedekind himself in the role of Dr. Schön.
- March 25 – O. Henry is imprisoned in Ohio Penitentiary, Columbus, for embezzlement.
- May 28 – Max Beerbohm succeeds George Bernard Shaw as theater critic of The Saturday Review (London); Shaw introduces him as "The Incomparable Max".
- June – First appearance of E. W. Hornung's fictional gentleman thief A. J. Raffles in the story "The Ides of March" in Cassell's Magazine (London).
- December 2 – Moscow Art Theatre's first season opens with a double bill of Emilia Matthai's Greta's Happiness and Carlo Goldoni's The Mistress of the Inn. The successful and influential Moscow Art Theatre production of The Seagull by Chekhov (its Moscow première), would open on 29 December [O.S. 17 December] 1898.
- unknown dates
  - Peadar Ua Laoghaire's story Séadna begins serialisation in Ireland as the first Irish language novel (published in book form 1904).
  - Gerald Duckworth establishes the publishers Gerald Duckworth and Company in London. Henry James's novella In the Cage is among their first year's output.
  - English designer C. R. Ashbee begins book production at the Essex House Press.
  - Joseph Wright's English Dialect Dictionary begins publication.
  - The "Generation of '98" writers and thinkers are active in Spain.
  - The term "Young Poland" is coined after a manifesto by Artur Górski, published in the Kraków newspaper Życie ("Life"), to signify the period of modernism in the Polish arts.

== New books ==
=== Fiction ===
- Txomin Agirre – Aunamendiko Lorea
- Leonid Andreyev – "Bargamot and Garaska" (Баргамот и Гараська, short story)
- Elizabeth von Arnim – Elizabeth and Her German Garden
- F. W. Bain – A Digit of the Moon
- L. Frank Baum – By the Candelabra's Glare
- Arnold Bennett – A Man from the North
- Vicente Blasco Ibáñez – The Shack (La barraca)
- Mary Elizabeth Braddon – Rough Justice
- N. D. Cocea – Poet-Poetă
- Ralph Connor – Black Rock
- Joseph Conrad – Tales of Unrest
- Alexander Craig – Ionia
- Stephen Crane
  - The Monster and Other Stories
  - The Open Boat and Other Tales
- Stephanus Jacobus du Toit – Die Koningin van Skeba
- Paul Laurence Dunbar
  - Folks From Dixie (short stories)
  - The Uncalled
- Finley Peter Dunne – Mr. Dooley in Peace and in War
- John Fox, Jr. – The Kentuckians
- Ángel Ganivet – Los trabajos del infatigable creador Pío Cid
- Maurice Hewlett – Forest Lovers
- Anthony Hope – Rupert of Hentzau
- Joris-Karl Huysmans – La Cathédrale
- Henry James – The Turn of the Screw (novella in The Two Magics)
- Olha Kobylianska – Valse melancolique
- Jerome K. Jerome – The Second Thoughts of an Idle Fellow
- John Luther Long – "Madame Butterfly"
- Pierre Louÿs – The Woman and the Puppet (La Femme et le pantin)
- Charles Major – When Knighthood Was in Flower
- George Moore – Evelyn Innes
- Władysław Reymont – The Promised Land (Ziemia Obiecana; serialization completed)
- Morgan Robertson – Futility, or the Wreck of the Titan
- Garrett P. Serviss – Edison's Conquest of Mars (serialization)
- Italo Svevo – Senilità (As a Man Grows Older)
- Mary Augusta Ward – Helbeck of Bannisdale
- Theodore Watts-Dunton – Aylwin
- H. G. Wells – The War of the Worlds (book publication)
- Edward Noyes Westcott – David Harum
- Owen Wister – Lin McLean
- Charlotte Mary Yonge – The Armourer's Prentices
- Émile Zola – Paris

=== Children and young people ===
- J. Meade Falkner – Moonfleet
- Kenneth Grahame – Dream Days (dated 1899)
- Emilio Salgari – Il Corsaro Nero (The Black Corsair – first in the Black Corsair series of five books)
- Ernest Thompson Seton – Wild Animals I Have Known
- Jules Verne – The Mighty Orinoco (Le Superbe Orénoque)

=== Drama ===
- Gabriele D'Annunzio
  - Città Morta
  - La Gioconda
  - Sogno di un Pomeriggio d' Autunno
- R. C. Carton – Lord and Lady Algy
- José Echegaray – La duda (The Calum)
- Clyde Fitch – Nathan Hale
- John Oliver Hobbes (Pearl Craigie) – The Ambassador
- Arthur Wing Pinero – Trelawny of the 'Wells'
- George Bernard Shaw – Arms and the Man
- Iosif Vulcan – Soare cu ploaie (Sunshower)

=== Poetry ===
- Thomas Hardy – Wessex Poems and Other Verses
- Oscar Wilde (originally as "C.3.3") – The Ballad of Reading Gaol

=== Non-fiction ===
- Catherine Isabella Dodd – Introduction to the Herbartian Principles of Teaching
- Ebenezer Howard – To-Morrow: A Peaceful Path to Real Reform
- Fred T. Jane – Jane's All the World's Fighting Ships
- Sidney Lee – A Life of William Shakespeare
- Liliʻuokalani – Hawaii's Story by Hawaii's Queen
- Thérèse of Lisieux (died 1897) – The Story of a Soul (L'Histoire d'une âme)
- Samuel Liddell MacGregor Mathers – The Book of Sacred Magic of Abra-Melin the Mage
- A. E. Waite – The Book of Black Magic and of Pacts

== Births ==
- February 6 – Melvin B. Tolson, African-American modernist poet (died 1966)
- February 10
  - Bertolt Brecht, German playwright and poet (died 1956)
  - Joseph Kessel, French journalist and author (died 1979)
- February 14 – Raúl Scalabrini Ortiz, Argentine writer, journalist, essayist and poet (died 1959)
- March 12 – Tian Han, Chinese dramatist (died 1968)
- April 8 – Maurice Bowra, English poet and humorist (died 1971)
- May 18 – Faruk Nafiz Çamlıbel, Turkish poet, author, and playwright (died 1973)
- May 19 – Julius Evola, Italian esotericist, journalist and philosopher (died 1974)
- May 23 – Scott O'Dell, American children's author (died 1989)
- June 9 – Curzio Malaparte, Italian novelist, playwright, and journalist (died 1957)
- June 23 – Winifred Holtby, English novelist and journalist (died 1935)
- July 8 – Alec Waugh, English novelist (died 1981)
- July 9 – Gerard Walschap, Belgian writer (died 1989)
- July 22
  - Stephen Vincent Benét, American poet and short-story writer (died 1943)
  - Erich Maria Remarque, German novelist (died 1970)
- August 23 – George Papashvily, Georgian-American sculptor and author (died 1978)
- August 28 – Malcolm Cowley, American novelist, poet, literary critic and journalist (died 1989)
- September 13 – Arthur J. Burks, American writer (died 1974)
- September 15 – J. Slauerhoff, Dutch poet and novelist (died 1936)
- September 16 – H. A. Rey, German-born American children's writer and illustrator (died 1977)
- October 9 – Tawfiq al-Hakim, Egyptian novelist and dramatist (died 1987)
- October 17 – Simon Vestdijk, Dutch writer (died 1971)
- November 14 – Benjamin Fondane, Romanian-born French poet, playwright and critic (died 1944)
- November 25 – Debaki Bose, Indian actor, director and writer (died 1971)
- November 29 – C. S. Lewis, English novelist and children's writer (died 1963)
- December 27 – W. C. Sellar, English humorous writer (died 1951)
- December 30 – Claire Huchet Bishop, Swiss children's author (died 1993)

== Deaths ==
- January 14 – Lewis Carroll (Charles L. Dodgson), English scholar and children's writer (born 1832)
- January 18 – Henry Liddell, English lexicographer of Greek (born 1811)
- March 6 – Felice Cavallotti, Italian poet, playwright and politician (born 1842)
- March 24 – George Thomas Stokes, Irish church historian (born 1843)
- March 25 – James Payn, English novelist (born 1830)
- March 31 – Eleanor Marx, English political writer and translator (born 1855)
- May 22 – Edward Bellamy, American novelist (born 1850)
- July 14 – Eliza Lynn Linton, English novelist and journalist (born 1822)
- July 20 – Jean Ingelow, English poet and novelist (born 1820)
- August 7 – Georg Ebers, German novelist and Egyptologist (born 1837)
- August 17 – Sir William Fraser, 4th Baronet, English politician, author and book collector (born 1826)
- September 9 – Stéphane Mallarmé, French Symbolist poet (born 1842)
- September 20 – Theodor Fontane, German novelist and poet (born 1819)
- September 29 – William Kingsford, English-born Canadian historian (born 1819)
- November 29 – Ángel Ganivet, Spanish writer (born 1865; suicide by drowning)
- December 10 – William Black, Scottish novelist (born 1841)

== Awards ==
- Newdigate prize – John Buchan
