= The Mad Gardener's Song =

Poem by Lewis Carroll

- by Lewis Carroll
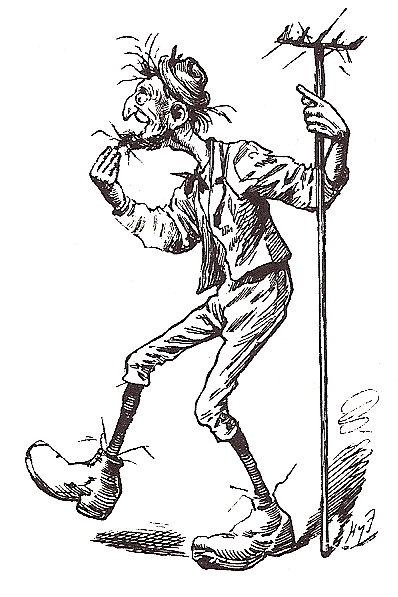
- The Mad Gardener, illustrated by Harry Furniss
- Illustrator: Harry Furniss
- Country: United Kingdom
- Language: English
- Genre(s): Nonsense verse
- Meter: Alternating lines of iambic tetrameter and iambic trimeter
- Rhyme scheme: abcbdb
- Publisher: Macmillan and Co.
- Lines: 54

"The Mad Gardener's Song" is a poem by Lewis Carroll that appears in his two linked novels: Sylvie and Bruno and Sylvie and Bruno Concluded (published in 1889 and 1893 respectively).

"And what a wild being it was who sang these wild words! A Gardener he seemed to be—yet surely a mad one, by the way he brandished his rake—madder, by the way he broke, ever and anon, into a frantic jig—maddest of all, by the shriek in which he brought out the last words of the stanza!" (Sylvie and Bruno, Chapter V).

== Structure ==
The poem consists of nine stanzas, each of six lines. Each stanza contains alternating lines in iambic tetrameter and iambic trimeter, and the three trimetric lines rhyme with each other. The verses are scattered throughout the novels, eight verses in Sylvie and Bruno and one in Sylvie and Bruno Concluded, as follows:

From Sylvie and Bruno:

Verse 1—Chapter V. A Beggar's Palace.

Verse 2—Chapter VI. The Magic Locket.

Verse 3—Chapter VI. The Magic Locket.

Verse 4—Chapter VII. The Baron's Embassy.

Verse 5—Chapter VIII. A Ride on a Lion.

Verse 6—Chapter IX. A Jester and a Bear.

Verse 7—Chapter XII. A Musical Gardener.

Verse 8—Chapter XII. A Musical Gardener.

From Sylvie and Bruno Concluded:

Verse 9—Chapter XX. Gammon and Spinach.

The last four lines of the eighth verse are repeated just before the final verse in Sylvie and Bruno Concluded.

== Text ==
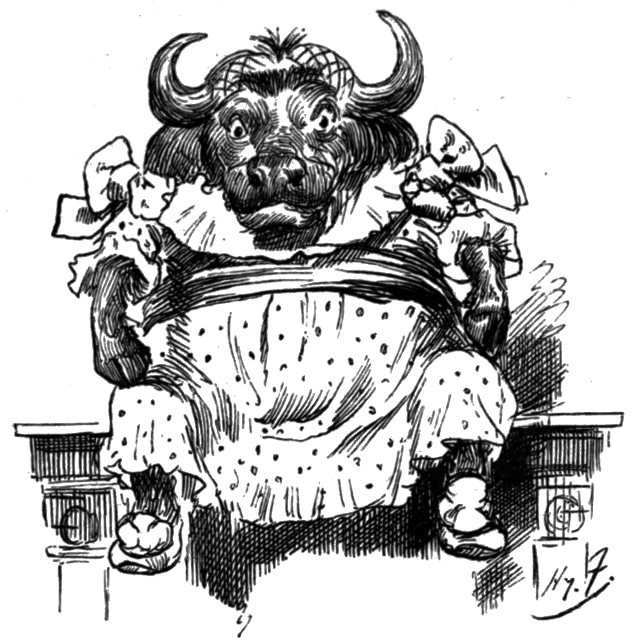
He thought he saw a Buffalo / Upon the chimney-piece

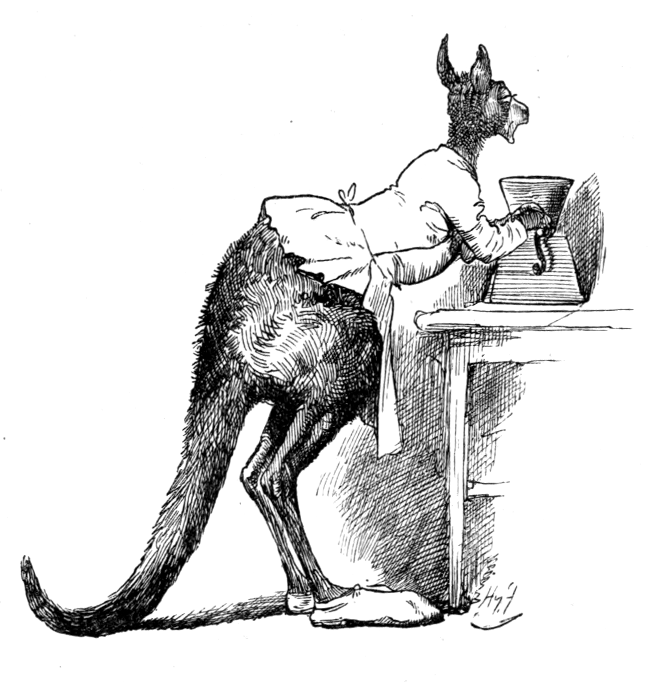
He thought he saw a Kangaroo / That worked a coffee-mill

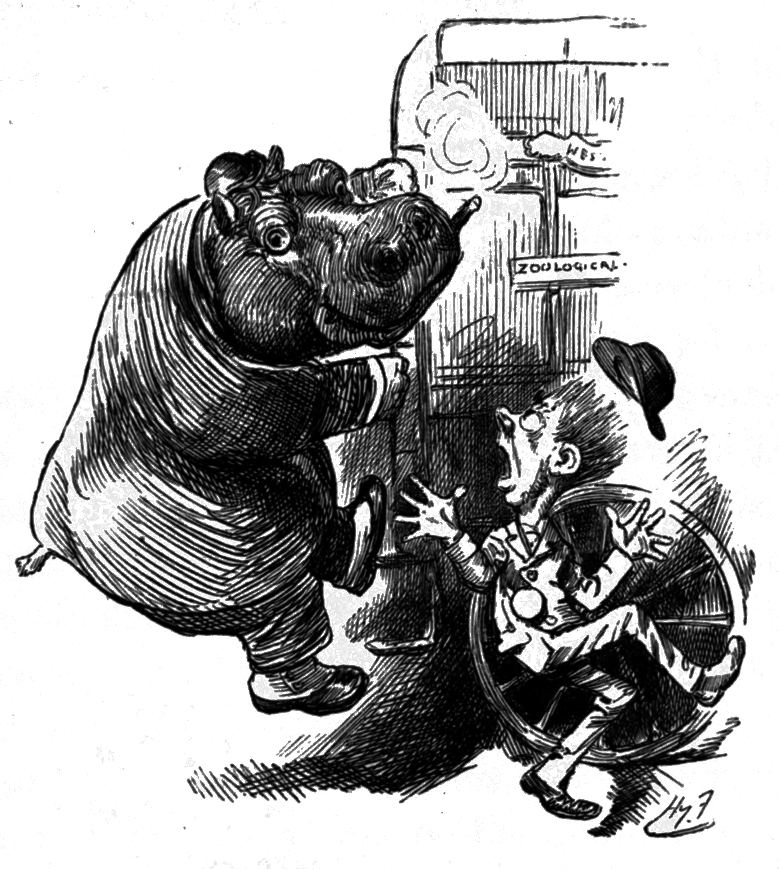
Hippopotamus descending from a bus

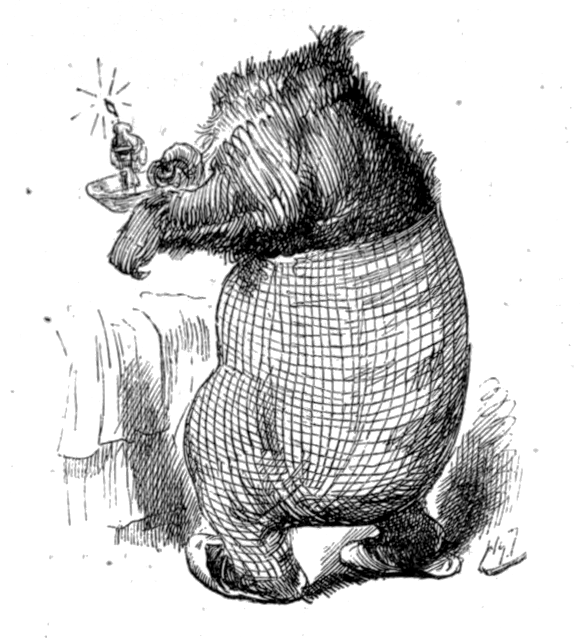
Illustration of the "Bear without a Head"

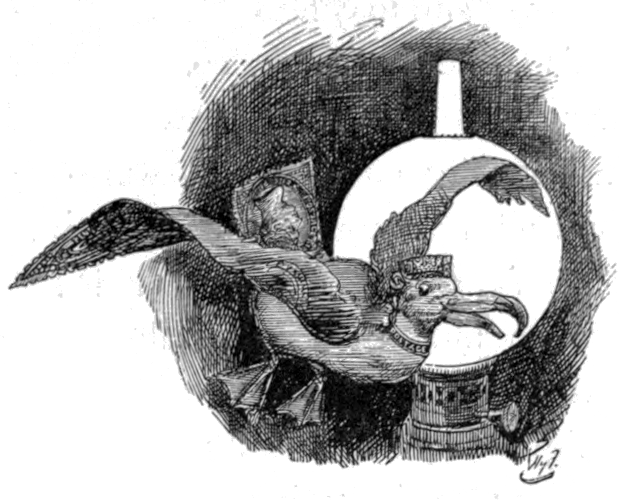
He thought he saw an Albatross / That fluttered round the lamp

He thought he saw an Elephant,
That practised on a fife:
He looked again, and found it was
A letter from his wife.
"At length I realise," he said,
"The bitterness of Life!"

He thought he saw a Buffalo
Upon the chimney-piece:
He looked again, and found it was
His Sister's Husband's Niece.
"Unless you leave this house," he said,
"I'll send for the Police!"

He thought he saw a Rattlesnake
That questioned him in Greek:
He looked again, and found it was
The Middle of Next Week.
"The one thing I regret," he said,
"Is that it cannot speak!"

He thought he saw a Banker's Clerk
Descending from the bus:
He looked again, and found it was
A Hippopotamus.
"If this should stay to dine," he said,
"There won't be much for us!"

He thought he saw a Kangaroo
That worked a coffee-mill:
He looked again, and found it was
A Vegetable-Pill.
"Were I to swallow this," he said,
"I should be very ill!"

He thought he saw a Coach-and-Four
That stood beside his bed:
He looked again, and found it was
A Bear without a Head.
"Poor thing," he said, "poor silly thing!
It's waiting to be fed!"

He thought he saw an Albatross
That fluttered round the lamp:
He looked again, and found it was
A Penny-Postage-Stamp.
"You'd best be getting home," he said:
"The nights are very damp!"

He thought he saw a Garden-Door
That opened with a key:
He looked again, and found it was
A double Rule of Three:
"And all its mystery," he said,
"Is clear as day to me!"

He thought he saw an Argument
That proved he was the Pope
He looked again, and found it was
A Bar of Mottled Soap.
"A fact so dread," he faintly said,
"Extinguishes all hope!"

== Reception ==
In his Bright Dreams Journal, Gary R. Hess called the poem "the only bright part of the book."

In The Aesthetics of Children's Poetry: A Study of Children's Verse in English, Katherine Wakely-Mulroney described the poem as "an incantatory, cyclical poem which reflects and even prefigures aspects of the prose narrative."

Harold Bloom selects the poem, along with "The Hunting of the Snark," "A Pig-Tale," and "The Walrus and the Carpenter," for inclusion in The Best Poems of the English Language, calling it "unmatchable" and writing: "That presumably unopened letter starts the Gardener off on a series of hallucinations, the most harrowing of which is the last ... As pontiff, he would be unmarried: the dread letter will have to be opened."

== Collections ==
- Lewis Carroll (1967). The Mad Gardener's Song. illustrated by Sean Morrison. Bobs-Merrill. LCCN 67-20458.

== Adaptations ==
"The Mad Gardener's Song" featured on the BBC show Play School in 1981.

Composer Stuart Findlay set "The Mad Gardener's Song" to viola, clarinet, and piano in 1994.
