= Harry Furniss =

English illustrator

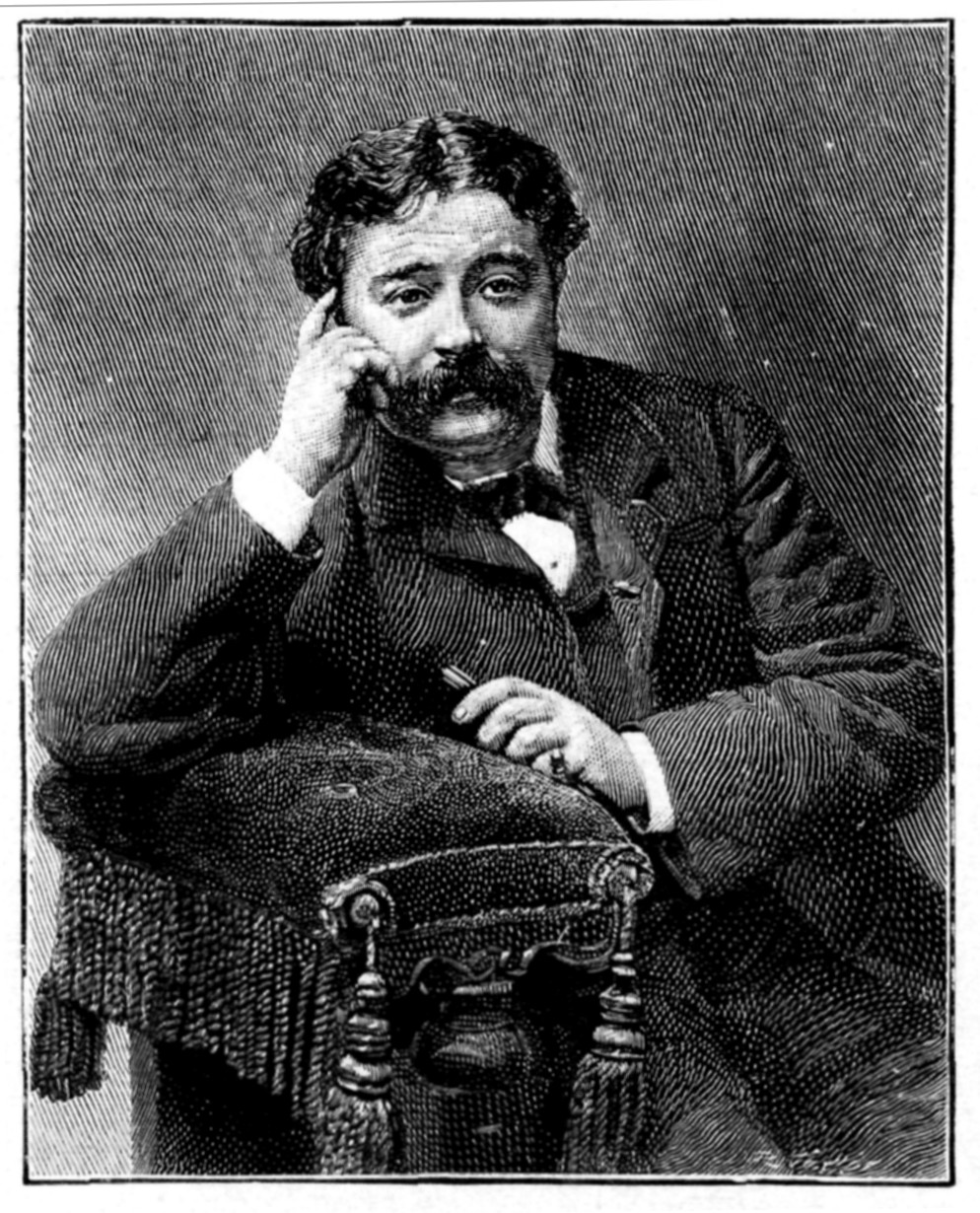
Furniss aged 26, at about the time he started to work for Punch.

Furniss's signature.

Harry Furniss (26 March 1854 – 14 January 1925) was a British illustrator. He established his career on the Illustrated London News before moving to Punch. He also illustrated Lewis Carroll's novel Sylvie and Bruno.

== Biography ==
Although Furniss was born in Wexford, Ireland, he identified himself as English, his father being English and his mother Scottish. He was educated at Dublin's Wesley College.

His first job as an illustrator was for the Illustrated Sporting and Dramatic News, and when it was purchased by the owner of The Illustrated London News he moved to that magazine. There he produced illustrations of social events such as the Boat Race, Goodwood and even the annual fancy dress ball at Brookwood Asylum, as well as acting as a special correspondent reporting on aspects of life in contemporary England, such as the scandalous divorce trial of Lady Colin Campbell. The following extract from his autobiography gives due warning that his illustrations should not always be thought of as being produced by a witness to the events depicted.

One boat race, for example, is very much like another. Some years ago I executed a panoramic series of sketches of the University Race from start to finish, and as they were urgently wanted, the drawings had to be sent in the same day. Early in the morning, before the break of fast, I found myself at Putney, rowing up to Mortlake, taking notes of the different points on the way — local colour through a fog. Getting home before the Londoners started for the scene, I was at work, and the drawings — minus the boats — were sent in shortly after the news of the race.

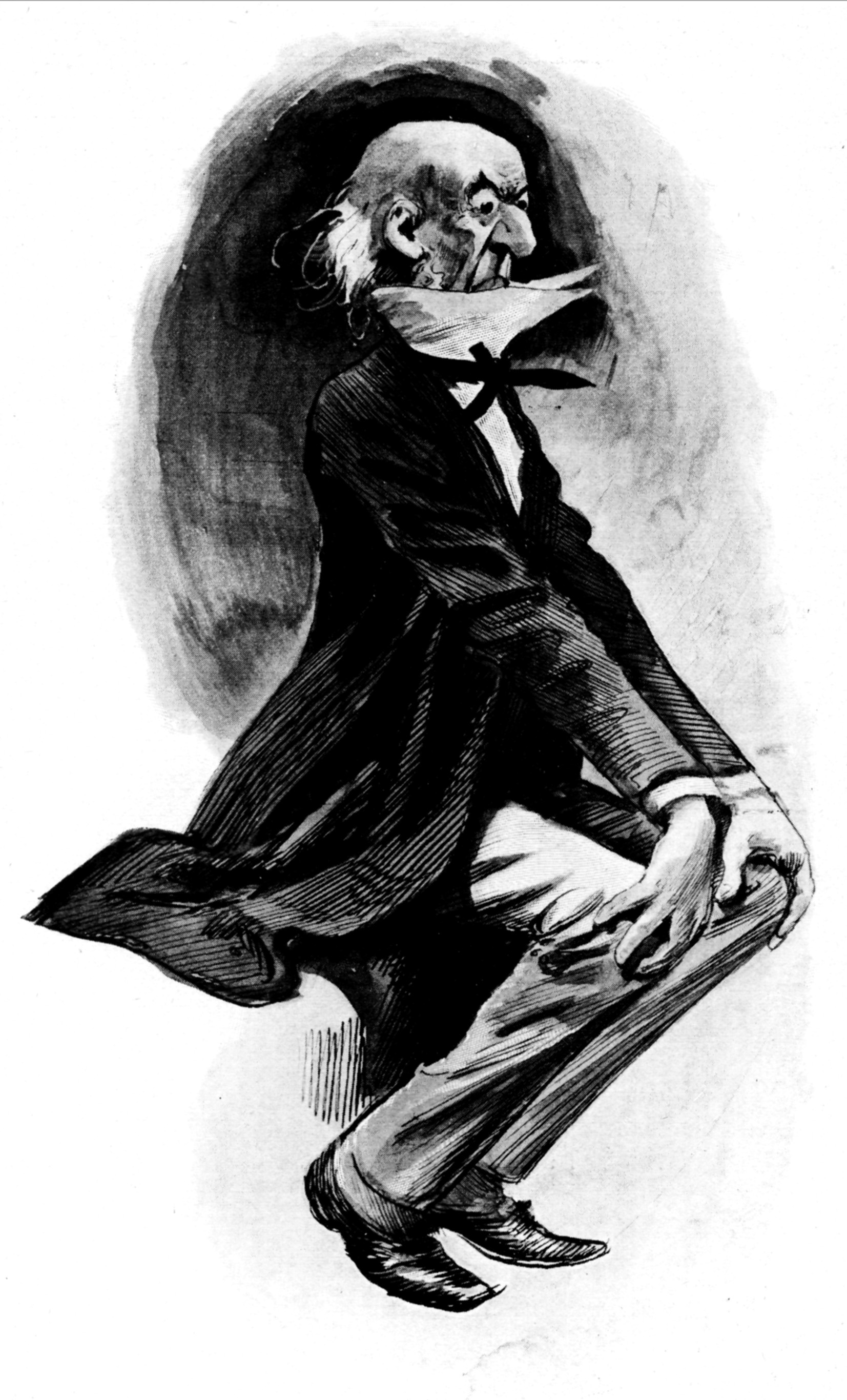
Furniss's caricature of William Ewart Gladstone

After some years Furniss moved to The Graphic, initially writing and illustrating a series of supplements titled "Life in Parliament", and he comments that "from this time forward it would be difficult to name any illustrated paper with which I have not at sometime or other been connected".

His most famous humorous drawings were published in Punch, for which he started working in 1880, and to which he contributed over 2,600 drawings. He left Punch in 1894 when its owners discovered that he had sold one of his 'Punch' drawings to Pears Soap for use in an advertising campaign.

He illustrated Lewis Carroll's novel Sylvie and Bruno in 1889 and Sylvie and Bruno Concluded in 1893. Carroll and Furniss sometimes produced both pictures and text simultaneously. Carroll exerted strong control over Furniss' illustration, to such an extent that Furniss would pretend to be out when Carroll called at his home. After completing Sylvie and Bruno Concluded Furniss vowed never to work for the author again.

In 1890, he illustrated the Badminton Library's volume on Golf.

On leaving Punch Furniss brought out his own humorous magazine Lika Joko, but when this failed he moved to America where he worked as a writer and actor in the fledgling film industry and where, in 1914, he pioneered the first animated cartoon film for Thomas Edison.

His two-volume autobiography, titled The Confessions of a Caricaturist was published in 1902, and a further volume of personal recollections and anecdotes, Harry Furniss At Home, was published in 1904.

Furniss wrote and illustrated twenty-nine books of his own, including Some Victorian Men and Some Victorian Women and illustrated thirty-four works by other authors, including the complete works of Charles Dickens and William Makepeace Thackeray.

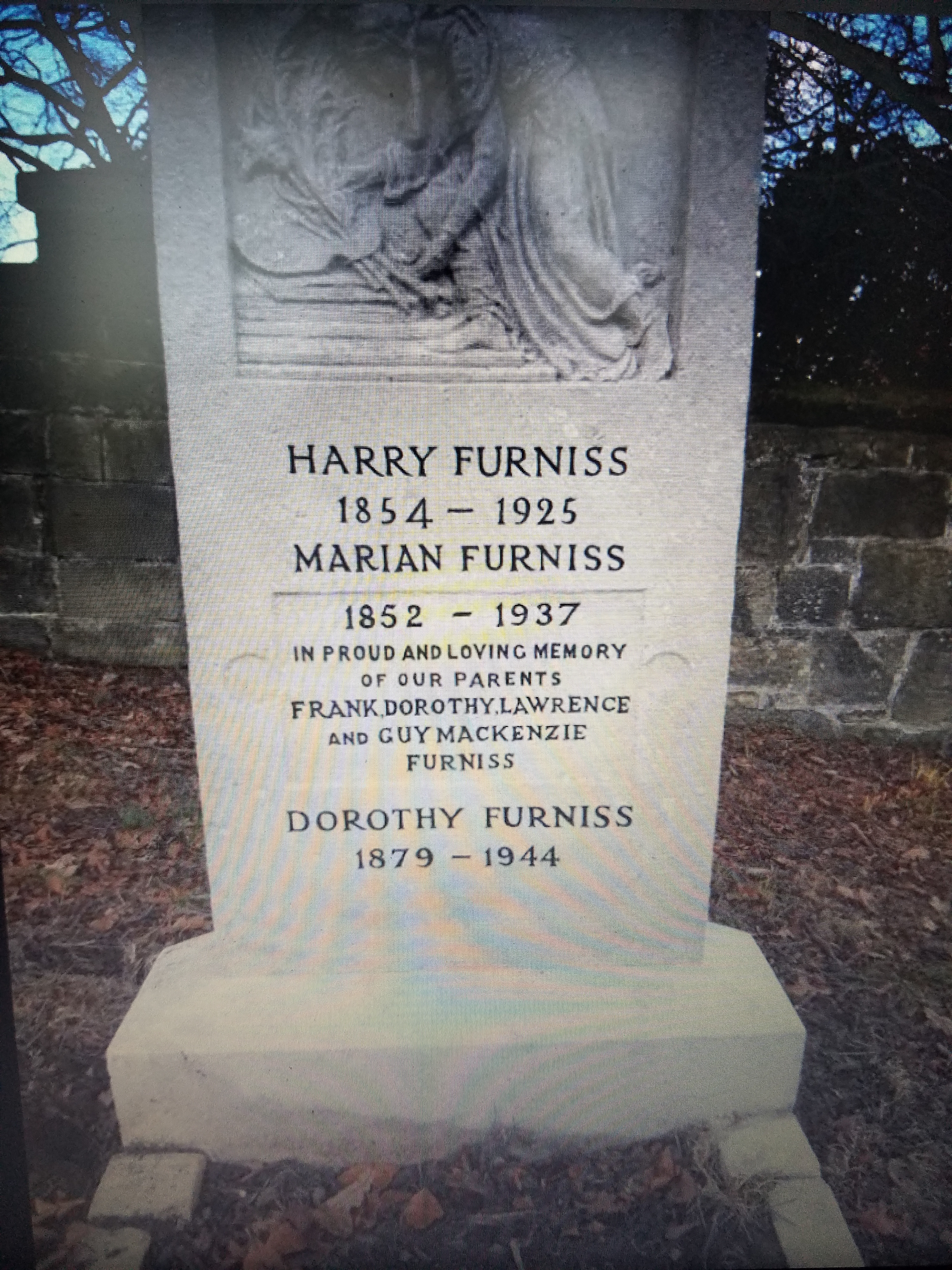
Furniss Family grave site, Hastings, England, refurbished in 2018 by Great Grandson; Noël Mark Furniss (California-USA)

On some projects, like his illustrations for G. E. Farrow's Wallypug books, Furniss collaborated with his daughter, fellow artist Dorothy Furniss (1879–1944).

Furniss married Marian Rogers in the Strand in 1877.

== Bibliography ==
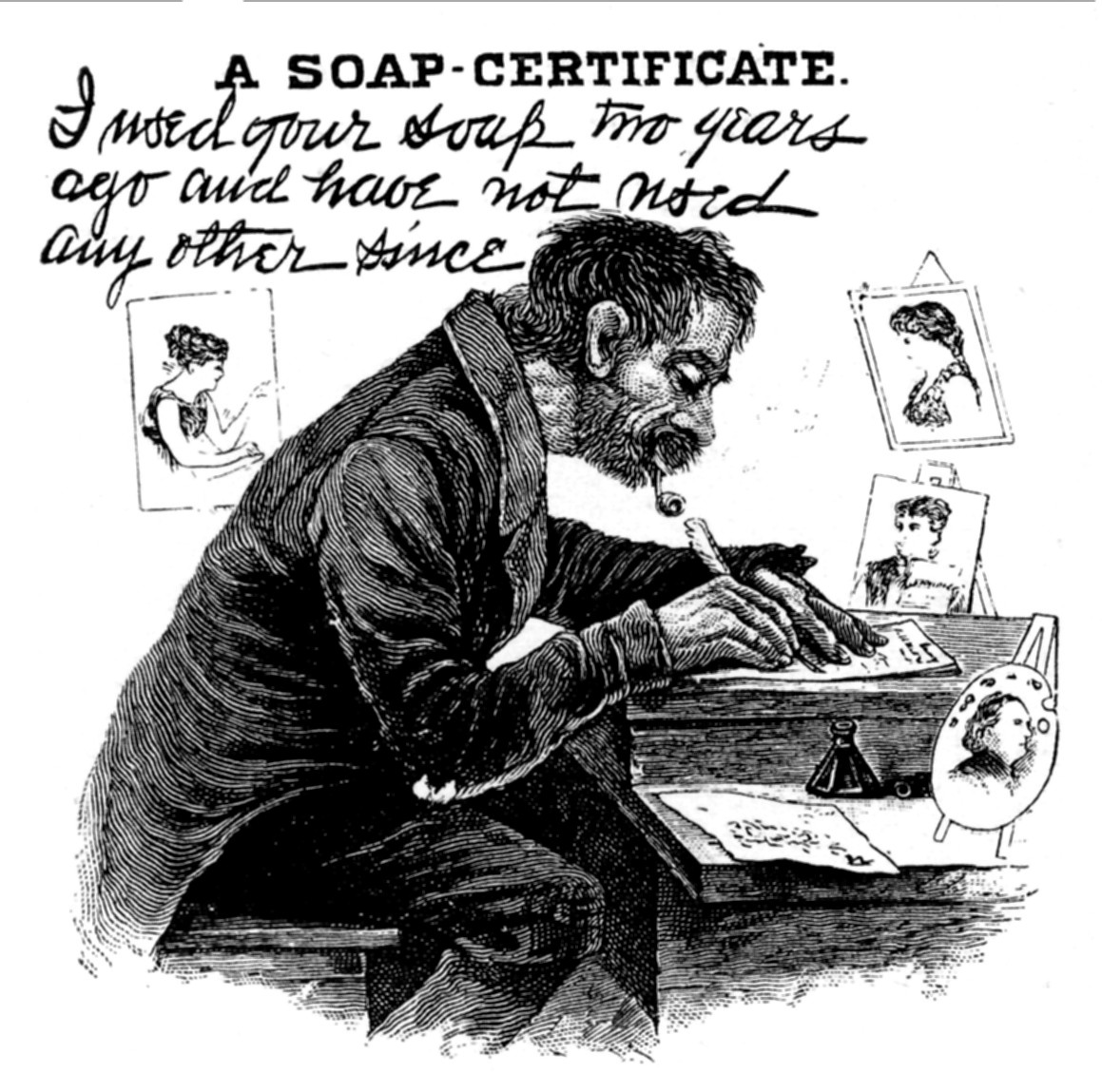
"I used your soap two years ago and have not used any other since", a Punch cartoon drawn by Furniss, parodying Thomas J. Barratt's adverts for Pears soap

=== Written and illustrated by Harry Furniss ===
- Royal Academy, an artistic joke — 1887
- Royal Academy antics — 1890
- M.P.'s in Session — 1889
- Australian Sketches- Made on Tour — 1899
- The Confessions of a Caricaturist — 1901
- Harry Furniss At Home — 1904
- Some Victorian Women - Good, Bad, and Indifferent — 1923
- Some Victorian Men — 1924
- The Two Pins Club — 1925

=== Works illustrated by Harry Furniss ===
- Romps with verses by Horace Lennard, printed by Edmund Evans — 1885
- Sylvie and Bruno by Lewis Carroll — 1889
- Brayhard, The Adventures of One Ass and Seven Champions — 1890
- Sylvie and Bruno Concluded by Lewis Carroll — 1893
- The Wallypug of Why by G. E. Farrow; 1895
- Gamble Gold by Judge Edward Abbott Parry — 1907
- Charles Dickens Library by Charles Dickens — 1910
- Lewis Carroll Alice's Adventures in Wonderland; 1885
- A Diary of the Salisbury Parliament, 1886-1892 by Henry W. Lucy; 1892
