= Aristopia =

1895 novel by Castello Holford

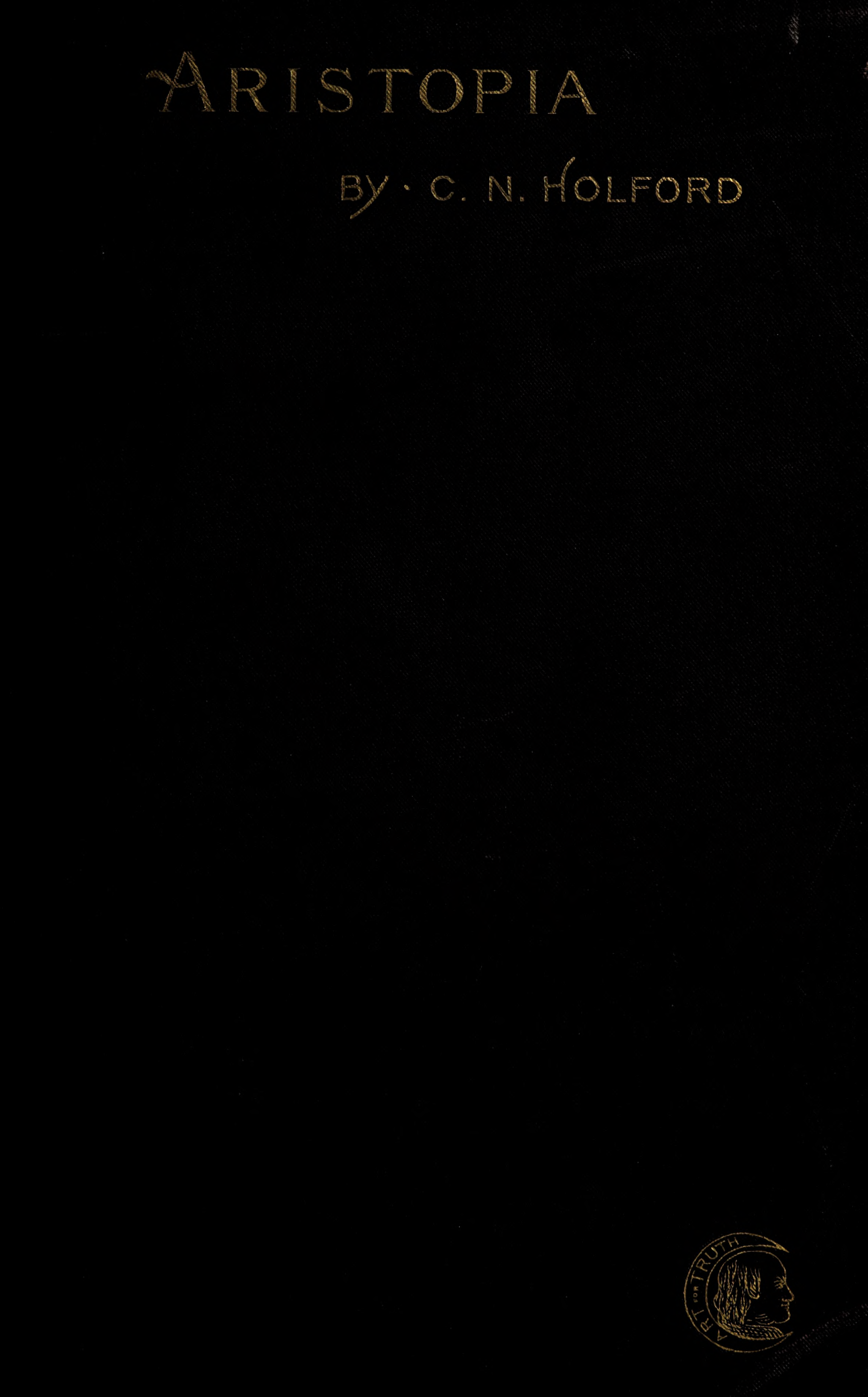
- Author: Castello Holford
- Language: English
- Genre: Alternate history Speculative fiction Utopian fiction Science fiction
- Publisher: Arena Publishing Co.
- Publication date: 1895
- Publication place: United States
- Media type: Print (Hardcover)
- Pages: 234 pp.
- Text: Aristopia at Wikisource

Aristopia: A Romance-History of the New World is an 1895 utopian novel by Castello Holford, considered the first novel-length alternate history in English (and among the earliest alternate histories in general).

Though part of the major wave utopian and dystopian literature that distinguished the final decades of the nineteenth century, Holford's book reverses the normal stance of utopian projection: instead of imagining a better society at a future time or in a far-off place, he supposes that the founding of the United States occurred under different conditions and follows its development forward to a superior society in his own day.

The English playwright Henry Arthur Jones was taken with the idea of Aristopia, and used it in his own polemical writings, as in his "The Tax-Wise Men of Aristopia" and his My Dear Wells.

Holford was not the first writer in English to employ the term "Aristopia." The eighteenth-century freethinker John Fransham (1730–1810) left a posthumous manuscript titled Memorablilia Classica, which contains a piece called "The Code of Aristopia, or Scheme for a Perfect Government."

== Plot summary ==
Ralph Morton, an early settler in Virginia, discovers a reef made of solid gold. He cannily uses his wealth to build a planned society called Aristopia (Greek for "the best place"), based on the Utopia of Sir Thomas More, with innovations and adaptations of his own. In Aristopia, all the land is owned by the government, and only leased to businesses and private citizens. Large-scale trade is also monopolized by the state, and inherited wealth is limited. Morton welcomes productive refugees from European conflicts — Huguenots, Irish fugitives from Cromwell's wars, and northern Italian and Swiss artisans.

The colony prospers, buys more land from the Indians, and spreads westward. Morton dies at the age of 100; his descendants and successors carry his policies forward.

The Aristopians support the American Revolution, and on their own initiative conquer Canada. Aristopia comes to dominate the new nation, eventually ruling all of North America north of Mexico.
