= Eugen Roth =

Bavarian poet

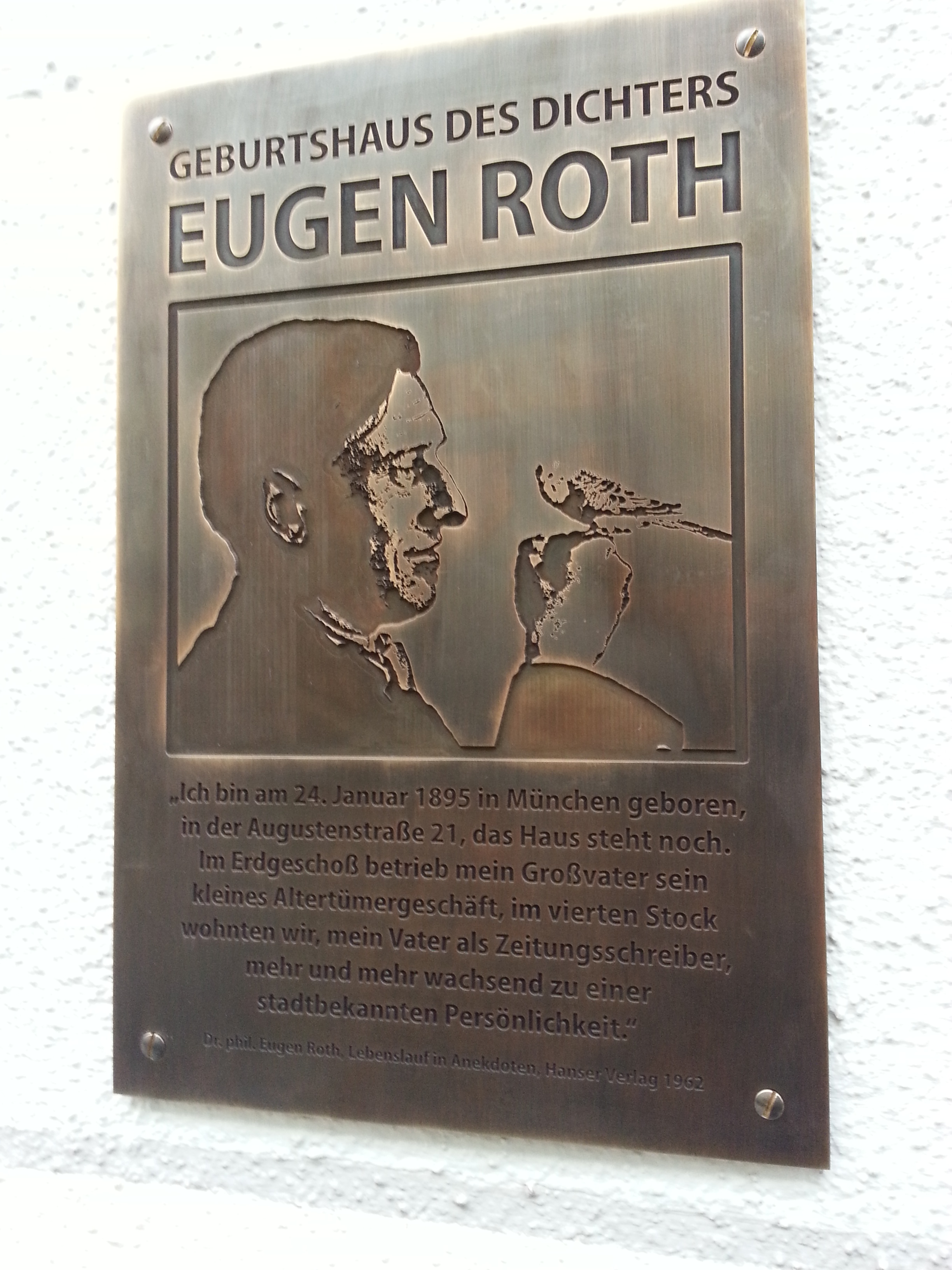
Memorial plaque, Augustenstraße 21, Munich

Eugen Roth (January 24, 1895 – April 28, 1976) was a Bavarian poet who wrote mostly humorous verse.

Roth was born in Munich, the son of the well-known Munich writer Hermann Roth. He volunteered for service in the First World War and was severely wounded. He studied history, art history, and philosophy and in 1922 he earned his doctorate degree. From 1927 to 1933, he was the editor of the Münchner Neuesten Nachrichten (Newest Munich News). Especially beloved were his humorous poems. He died in Munich, aged 81.

== Selected works ==
- Ein Mensch (Humans) (1935)
- Eugen Roths Tierleben (Eugen Roth's Animal life) (1948)
- Heitere Kneipp-Fibel (Kneipp's Humorous Booklet) (1954)
- Humorapotheke (Humor-pharmacy) (1956 - 1959)
- Das Eugen-Roth-Buch (The Eugen Roth Book) (1966)
- Der Wunderdoktor-Heitere Verse (The Miracle Doctor's Humorous Verses) (1939)

== Awards ==
- Munich art prize for literature (1952)
