= William Kingsford =

Canadian historian

William Kingsford (23 December 1819 – 29 September 1898) was an English-born Canadian historian and civil engineer. He is best known for his History of Canada in 10 volumes (1887–1898), which was widely read by both the upper middle class and Anglophone teachers.

Born in London, England, Kingsford traveled to Canada, where he served in the army before engaging in surveying work. He was a self-taught historian, and one of the first to use the archives being gathered in Ottawa. He was also a civil engineer, working across North America to install railways such as the Hudson River Railroad. His work led him to Panama, where he assisted in construction of the Panama Canal Railway. Kingsford served a brief term as the chief engineer of Toronto, Canada.

Kingsford believed that the Conquest of New France guaranteed victory for British constitutional liberty and that it ensured material progress. He assumed the assimilation of French Canadians into a superior British culture was inevitable and desirable, for he envisioned Canada as one nation with one anglophone population.

== Early life ==
Born on 23 December 1819 in the parish of St. Lawrence Jewry, London, he was the son of William and Elizabeth Kingsford of Lad Lane. Educated at Nicholas Wanostrocht's school in Camberwell, he was articled at an early age to an architect. He then enlisted in the 1st Dragoon Guards, aged 16. He went with his regiment to Canada in 1837, became sergeant, and in 1840, through the influence of his friends at home, obtained his discharge, despite an offer by Sir George Cathcart, colonel of the regiment, to procure a commission for him.

== Civil engineer ==
Entering the office of the city surveyor of Montreal in 1841, Kingford qualified in due course as civil engineer, and obtained the position of deputy city surveyor, a post which he held for three years. He resigned to begin the publication of the Montreal Times, in company with Murdo McIver. Two years later he entered the public works department, and among other undertakings made a new survey of the Lachine Canal.

In 1849 Kingsford was engaged in the construction of the Hudson River Railroad in the state of New York. In he 1851 went to Panama as assistant engineer to J. J. Campbell, who was then building the Panama Canal Railway. Returning to Canada in 1853, he surveyed for the Grand Trunk Railway railroad tracks running from Montreal to Vaudreuil, from Montreal to Cornwall, Ontario, from Brockville to Rideau, and, under A. M. Ross, laid down the lines of the Victoria Bridge.

Kingsford was chief engineer of the city of Toronto for a few months during 1855, but resigned to re-enter the service of the Grand Trunk, in whose employment he remained till 1864. He acted at first as superintendent of the line east from Toronto, and afterwards as contractor to maintain the section that runs from that city westward to Stratford. He came to England in 1865, where he made one or two general surveys on the continent for English firms. He reported to Thomas Brassey on the railway possibilities of the island of Sardinia.

In 1867, the building of the Intercolonial Railway took Kingsford to Canada once more to Canada, where he remained for the rest of his life. He worked on the enlargement of the Grenville Canal and the draining of Russell, Ontario, moving to Ottawa. When the Mackenzie government came into power in 1872 Kingsford was appointed dominion engineer in charge of the harbours of the Great Lakes and the St. Lawrence River. He continued in this post till 31 December 1879, when he was dismissed by Sir Hector Langevin, minister of public works.

== Later life ==
At the age of 60, Kingsford then turned to Canadian history. Queen's University and Dalhousie University recognised Kingsford's historical works by conferring on him the degree of LL.D.; and McGill University gave his name to a recently endowed chair of history. He survived the completion of his History by a few months only, and died on 28 September 1898.

== Works ==
Kingsford began writing for the press, and published some pamphlets:

- The History, Structure, and Statistics of Plank-roads, 1852
- Impressions of the West and South, 1858
- The Canadian Canals: their History and Cost, 1865

and a monograph on Canadian history entitled A Political Coin.

Kingsford studied of the archives of Canada, collected at Ottawa, from 1880. He published Canadian Archæology in 1886, soon followed by the Early Bibliography of Ontario. He published the first volume of the History of Canada in 1887. The tenth and last volume went up to the union of Upper and Lower Canada (1841), and was printed in 1898, with a preface dated 24 May.

Kingsford was a fellow of the Royal Society of Canada, to which he contributed several papers, and a member of the Canadian Society of Civil Engineers. He published correspondence and proceedings related to his sacking in a pamphlet Mr. Kingsford and Sir Hector Langevin (1882).

== Family ==
In 1848 Kingsford married Maria Margaret, daughter of William Burns Lindsay, clerk of the legislative assembly of the province of Canada. Queen Victoria gave her his widow's civil list pension after his death.
