= Romps =

Romps was a series of tales illustrated by Harry Furniss, with verses by Horace Lennard and printed by Edmund Evans in 1885. The comical picture book depicts children romping in various settings.

For the illustrations, Harry Furniss used his own children as models. The illustrations received praise from George du Maurier.

Hearts are kept by Love and Glee
Young and buoyant as a feather
Come then, children, follow me,
Let us have a romp together.
