= Castello Holford =

American writer

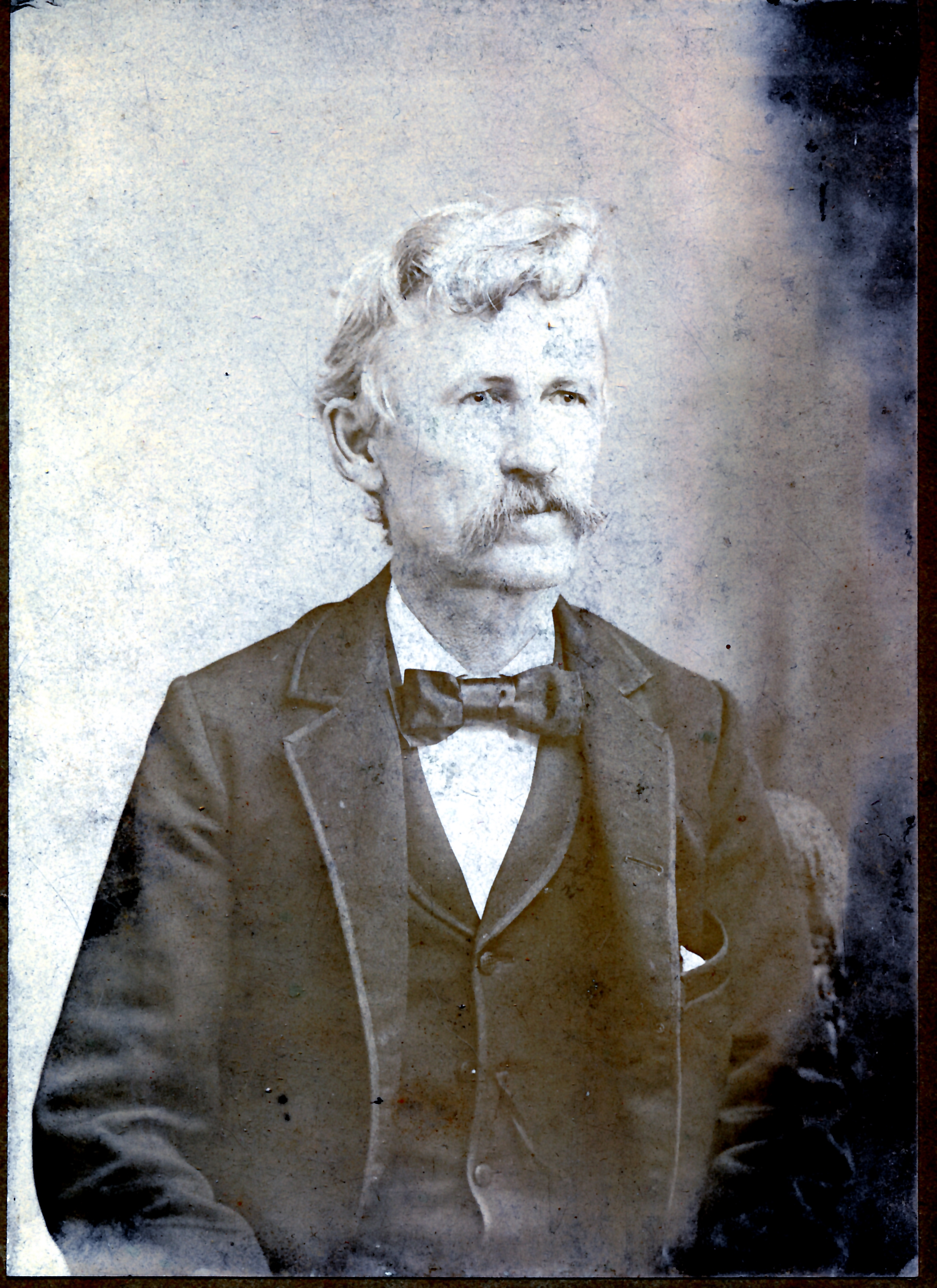
- Born: Castello Newton Holford; 7 December 1845; Beetown (later Bloomington) Wisconsin, United States
- Died: 29 May 1905 (aged 59)
- Occupation: writer
- Known for: served in Company D, 33rd Wisconsin Volunteer Infantry, during American Civil War
- Notable work: Aristopia (1895)

Castello Newton Holford (1845–1905) was an American writer best known for writing Aristopia in 1895. It is perhaps the first true alternative history novel to be written in English and imagines a utopian society founded by the first settlers of Virginia.

He also wrote a 'History of Grant County, Wisconsin including its civil, political, geological, mineralogical, archaeological and military history, and a history of the several towns' in 1900.

C.N. Holford served in Company D of the 33rd Wisconsin Volunteer Infantry with his older brother, William H. Holford. As his brigade lay before Vicksburg, his brother, Lyman, lay on the battlefield at Gettysburg, PA. having a leg wound suffered on the first day of battle. Their older brother, Hannibal H. Holford served a short enlistment in Simpson's Spies and Guides unit in New Mexico as a 1st Lieutenant. All four brothers survive the Civil War. Hannibal is discharged for rheumatism, Lyman is discharged in 1864 for wounds received at Gettysburg, and William and Castello mustered out with the unit in 1865.

He was born 7 December 1845 in Beetown (later Bloomington) Wisconsin and is the brother of Lyman D. Holford, 6th Wisconsin Volunteer Infantry of Tafton, Wisconsin and later Tulare, California. C.N. Holford died 29 May 1905 in Washington Asylum Hospital in Washington DC. He is buried in Arlington National Cemetery.
