= Sylvie and Bruno =

1889 novel by Lewis Carroll

Sylvie and Bruno Sylvie and Bruno Concluded
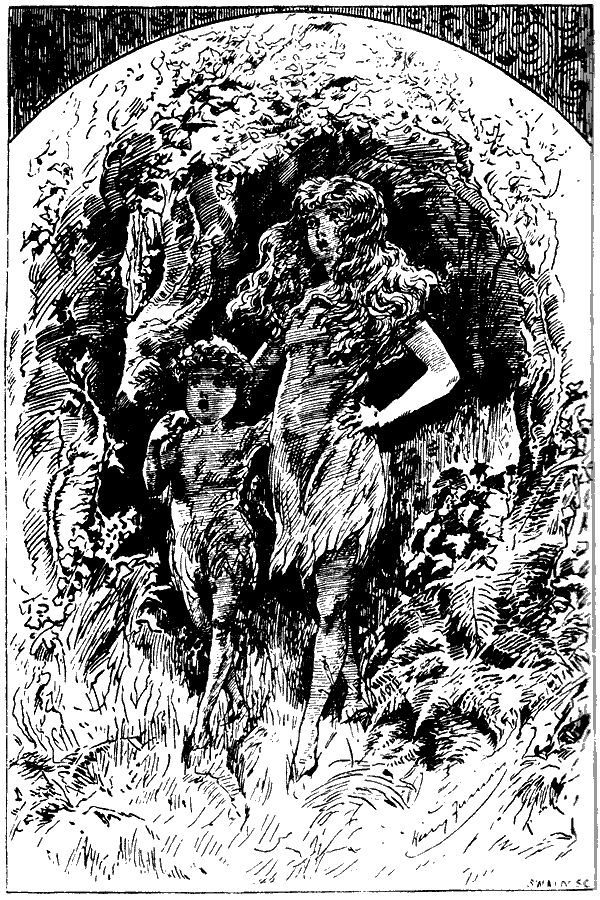
- frontispiece of second volume
- Author: Lewis Carroll
- Illustrator: Harry Furniss
- Language: English
- Genre: Fantasy
- Publisher: Macmillan and Co.
- Publication date: 13 December 1889; 29 December 1893
- Publication place: United Kingdom
- Media type: Print
- Pages: xxiii + 400pp xxxi + 423pp
- OCLC: 644529814
- Dewey Decimal: 823.8
- LC Class: PR4611 .S9

Sylvie and Bruno, first published in 1889, and its second volume Sylvie and Bruno Concluded published in 1893, form the last novel by Lewis Carroll published during his lifetime. Both volumes were illustrated by Harry Furniss.

The novel has two main plots: one set in the real world at the time the book was published (the Victorian era), the other in the fantasy world of Fairyland. While the latter plot is a fairy tale with many nonsense elements and poems, similar to Carroll's Alice books, the story set in Victorian Britain is a social novel, with its characters discussing various concepts and aspects of religion, society, philosophy and morality.

== Origin ==
Two short pieces, "Fairy Sylvie" and "Bruno's Revenge", originally appeared in Aunt Judy's Magazine in 1867. Some years later, in 1873 or 1874, Carroll had the idea to use these as the core for a longer story. Much of the rest of the novel he compiled from notes of ideas and dialogue which he had collected over the years (and which he called "litterature" in the introduction to the first volume).

Carroll initially intended for the novel to be published in one volume. However, due to its length, it was divided into two volumes, published in 1889 and 1893.

The novel is not nearly as well known as the Alice books. It was very poorly received and did not have many reprintings; modern commentators note that it lacks much of Carroll's characteristic humour. The poem The Mad Gardener's Song, widely reprinted elsewhere, is the best-known part of the book.

The introductory poem contains a double acrostic on the name "Isa Bowman", one of Carroll's child friends.

== Plot summary and major themes ==
=== Plot overview ===
There are two strands to the plot: the conspiracy against the Warden of Outland, instigated by the Sub-Warden and Chancellor, and the love of a young doctor, Arthur, for Lady Muriel.

=== Condensed narrative ===
==== Volume 1, Sylvie and Bruno ====
===== Conspiracy in Outland; Arthur and Lady Muriel =====
Chapter 1
The narrator is in his spacious breakfast-saloon, high above the noisy public square. The Chancellor has hired a mob to put on a ”spontaneous" protest, but the rioters seem confused whether to chant for more or less of bread and taxes. Bruno enters, looking for Sylvie, but he ends up on the Chancellor's knee with Sylvie, listening to the Warden's report of the Professor's return from his travels in search of health. In the Library the Professor tells them about his troubles with barometric and "horizontal weather" issues.

Chapter 2
The narrator finds himself in a train compartment, which a veiled young lady has just entered. He is on his way to see Arthur, a doctor friend, for a consultation; he rereads Arthur's letter, and absent-mindedly repeats out loud its last line, "Do you believe in Fate?" The lady laughs, and a conversation ensues. The scene changes abruptly to the breakfast-saloon, in which the Professor is explaining his plunge-bath invention to the Sub-Warden, his wife, her son, the Chancellor, Warden, Sylvie, and Bruno.

Chapter 3
The Chancellor tries to persuade the Warden to elevate the Sub-Warden to Vice-Warden. The Warden asks the Sub-Warden for a private talk. The Sub-Warden's wife asks the Professor about his Lecture, suggesting a Fancy Dress Ball. He gives Sylvie a birthday present: a pincushion. Uggug throws butter over Sylvie. The Sub-Warden distracts his wife by saying a pig is in the garden; the Chancellor drags Uggug out by his ear.

Chapter 4
The Warden agrees to the changes. After he has signed the Agreement and left (to become Monarch of Fairyland), the Chancellor, Vice-Warden and his wife laugh about how they have deceived him, the document having been altered at the last minute to give the Vice-Warden dictatorial powers. A beggar appears beneath the window; Uggug and his mother throw water over him. Bruno tries to throw him some food, but he has gone.

Chapter 5
The narrator wakes up, and he and the lady discuss ghosts. They change trains at Fayfield Junction; he notices her name on her luggage: Lady Muriel Orme. An old tramp is sent on his way. The narrator falls asleep again, and hears the first stanza of the Mad Gardener's Song. The Gardener directs Sylvie and Bruno after the beggar. They give him cake, and he leads them to an underground octagonal room lined with creepers bearing fruit and flowers. His clothes transform, and they find it is their father.

Chapter 6
He says they are in Elfland. Bruno tries to eat the fruit (Phlizz) but it has no taste. Their father shows Sylvie two lockets, one blue ("All will love Sylvie") and one red ("Sylvie will love all"). She chooses the red. The narrator finds himself at the railway station of his destination, Elveston. On arriving at Arthur's house, he tells him of Lady Muriel Orme, and it turns out that Arthur knows her and is in love with her. The narrator falls asleep again, and hears the Chancellor warn the Vice-Warden that the Ambassador of Elfland has arrived and that they will need to convince him that Uggug is Bruno, or as able as Bruno.

Chapter 7
The Ambassador, Baron Doppelgeist, is given demonstrations of Uggug's abilities which always happen when he is looking the other way. Finding his guestroom full of frogs, he leaves in anger.

Chapter 8
The narrator visits Lady Muriel and her father, the Earl, in the company of Arthur. They discuss weightlessness. Later, Arthur and the narrator visit the beach. Arthur goes home. Sylvie and Bruno go in search of the Beggar, their father. She rubs the red amulet, and a mouse is transformed into a lion, which they ride. Their father listens to their account of the Ambassador's visit; he cannot rectify the situation, but casts a spell.

Chapter 9
Uggug refuses to learn his lessons. The Vice-Warden and his wife try on disguises: jester and dancing bear. Uggug sees them and runs off to fetch the Professor. When he arrives, they are dressed normally, and they tell him that the people wish to elect an Emperor—the Vice-Warden.

===== Intermezzo =====
Chapter 10
The Professor takes Sylvie and Bruno to see the Other Professor. The Professor asks him about the Pig-Tale, which he promised to give after the Professor's Lecture. Bruno asks what "inconvenient" means.

Chapter 11
By way of illustration, the Other Professor recites Peter and Paul, 208 lines of verse.

Chapter 12
After a discussion, the Other Professor vanishes. Sylvie and Bruno complain to the Professor about their treatment, and ask him to tell the Gardener to open the garden door for them, so they can go to Fairyland to see their father.

Chapter 13
They walk a long way, stopping briefly to visit the King of Dogland, before entering the gate of Fairyland. Arthur tells the narrator that he has discovered that he has more wealth than he thought, and that marriage with Lady Muriel is at least possible.

Chapter 14
The narrator spends a month at London; when he returns, he finds that Arthur has still not yet declared his intentions. The narrator sets off to speak to the Earl; on the way he encounters first Sylvie (who is helping a Beetle) and then Bruno (who is spoiling Sylvie's garden). He persuades Bruno to help weed it instead.

Chapter 15
Bruno weeds the garden with the narrator's help.

===== Eric =====
Chapter 16
The Earl invites Arthur to a picnic in ten days' time. On the day, walking to their house, the narrator encounters Sylvie and Bruno again.

Chapter 17
The party leave the Earl's Hall and travel to a ruined castle, the site of the picnic. Muriel sings, but the narrator falls asleep, and her song becomes that of Bruno.

Chapter 18
Muriel introduces Captain Eric Lindon, a highly presentable young man. Arthur is in despair, and declines to return with the party in the same carriage. The narrator falls asleep again, and there is a meeting between Lindon, Sylvie, Bruno, and the Professor.

Chapter 19
A week later, Arthur and the narrator go to church. They discuss religion with Muriel, condemning High Church affectations, and moralising which relies on Pascal's Wager. The narrator helps carry a lame little girl upstairs at the railway station, and buys a posy in the street. The girl turns out to be Sylvie.

Chapter 20
He brings Sylvie and Bruno to the Earl's Hall. The Earl is astonished by the flowers, none of which are English. Muriel sings a new song. A couple of days later, the flowers have vanished. The narrator, Muriel, and the Earl idly sketch an alternative scheme for the animal kingdom.

Chapter 21
Sylvie asks the Professor for advice. He unlocks the Ivory Door for the two of them, and they meet Bruno. The Professor boasts of having devised the Emperor's new Money Act, doubling the value of every coin to make everyone twice as rich, and shows the narrator an "Outlandish" watch (essentially a kind of time machine). Sylvie finds a dead hare, and is horrified to learn that human beings hunt them.

Chapter 22
Arthur is even more discouraged. Muriel is surprised to discover that Eric has met Sylvie and Bruno. Eric saves Bruno from being run down by a train.

Chapter 23
The narrator tries to use the Outlandish watch to prevent an accident, but fails. He then uses it to witness, in reverse, some scenes of family life. Later, the narrator is talking to the Earl when he learns, and Arthur overhears, that Muriel is engaged to Eric.

Chapter 24
Sylvie and Bruno present a variety show to an audience of frogs, including "Bits of Shakespeare", and Bruno tells them a long rambling story.

Chapter 25
A week after discovering that Muriel is engaged, Arthur and the narrator go for the "last" time to the Earl's Hall. They discuss with Muriel how the Sabbath should best be kept, and the nature of free will. Arthur informs the narrator that he is leaving for India.

==== Volume 2, Sylvie and Bruno Concluded ====
===== A clean slate =====
Chapter 1
Several weeks pass in London. The narrator sees Eric Lindon at a club, and learns that Eric's engagement to Muriel is over, and that Arthur is still at Elveston. The narrator meets Bruno in a park; Sylvie gives Bruno his lessons. A thunderstorm drives the narrator home, where he finds a telegram from Arthur, asking him to come.

Chapter 2
As before, the narrator meets Lady Muriel while changing trains at Fayfield Junction. She is giving money to the old tramp (vol. 1, ch. 5). On their way to Elveston she says that Eric broke off their engagement because of her evident discomfort with Eric's lukewarm faith. Arthur does not know this.

Chapter 3
The next morning, on a walk, Arthur discusses his anti-socialist views, and condemns charity bazaars as "half charity, half self-pleasing". Sylvie and Bruno contrive that he should meet Muriel, who is also out walking.

Chapter 4
The narrator presses on without him to Hunter's farm to order milk. On his way he meets the farmer, who is talking to a woman about her hard-drinking husband, Willie. At the farm, the dog Nero (who is the Dog King from vol. 1, ch. 13) catches a boy who is stealing apples.

Chapter 5
The three of them meet the farmer's wife, daughter Bessie, and Bessie's doll, Matilda-Jane. On their way back to Elveston they pass the Golden Lion, a new public house.

Chapter 6
Willie comes walking down the road; Sylvie and Bruno invisibly drag him away from the pub. He delivers his wages to his wife, and swears off drink. The narrator walks back to the house, and learns that Arthur is now engaged to Muriel.

Chapter 7
At the Hall, the narrator finds Muriel with a man called "Mein Herr", who has a beard and a German accent, and bears a remarkable resemblance to the Professor. He shows them Fortunatus's Purse, and describes a gravity-powered train, a method of storing up extra time so that nobody ever gets bored, a carriage with oval wheels (with the end of one wheel corresponding to the side of the wheel opposite it, so that the carriage rises, falls, rolls, and pitches, and so anybody in the carriage gets vomitingly sick), and a carriage designed to prevent runaway horses from getting anywhere. Oddly enough, nobody seems to remember where they first met "Mein Herr", nor what his real name is, nor where he lives, nor where he's from. Lady Muriel admits that she never realised what a mysterious man he is until she met the narrator. A party is planned.

Chapter 8
Ten days pass. The day before the party, Arthur, Muriel and the narrator have tea at the Hall. Arthur argues that the gravity of a sin must be judged by the temptation preceding it. The Earl returns from the harbour-town with news of the spread of a fever.

===== A brief marriage =====
Chapter 9
At the party, conversation ranges over sanity and insanity, cheating at croquet versus cheating at whist, rational honeymoons, teetotalism, and keeping dinner parties interesting.

Chapter 10
An interlude, with the arrival of Sylvie and Bruno, the discussion of wine (which is transformed into a discussion of jam) and an unsatisfying musical performance.

Chapter 11
Another interlude, with "Mein Herr" telling tall tales about his country. He describes how nobody in his kingdom ever drowns, because they have been eugenically bred for dozens of generations to weigh less and less until everybody is lighter than water. He also hears that the largest map considered really useful would be six inches to the mile; although his country had learnt map-making from his host Nation, it had carried it much further, having gone through maps that are six feet to the mile, then six yards to the mile, next a hundred yards to the mile—finally, a mile to the mile (the farmers said that if such a map was to be spread out, it would block out the sun and crops would fail, so the project was abandoned). He goes on to portray some devices similar to modern planetary engineering or terraforming, and paint-balls. Finally, he describes a system of government where there are thousands of kings and one subject, instead of the other way around.

Chapter 12
Sylvie plays the piano for the assembled company. Mein Herr discusses incomprehensibility by describing how, in the days when he worked at a school in his country, there was an old professor who lectured to pupils, and, although his speeches were incomprehensible, the pupils were so impressed that they memorised the speeches. Many of these pupils got jobs as lecturers in schools, and repeated the speeches made by the first professor, and the pupils were impressed by the speeches and memorised them, getting jobs as lecturers in schools later on, until a day came when everyone realised that nobody understood what the speeches meant. Another craze was that of competitive examinations, when teachers motivated students by giving them money if the answers are correct, until eventually, the bright students in school make more money than the teachers do. The most insane craze was the Scholarship Hunts, when any principal that wanted a student in his college had to hunt them in the streets and the first principal to catch the student wins. One principal, theorising how bullets have accelerated velocity because they're spherical, becomes perfectly spherical, in an attempt to catch the brightest scholar. Unfortunately, the Principal runs too fast and soon finds himself going at 100 MPH and only stops after he crashes into a haybale. It is implied that if he hadn't deliberately run into a haybale, he would have run off the planet.

Chapter 13
A continuation of the Scholar Hunters story of chapter 12. Mein Herr explains how the Scholarship Hunts evolves into a more 'civilised' method of catching scholars; the children are offered more and more money for a scholarship in an event that amounts to auctioning them off. One day, a linguist finds an old African Legend (although the nature of the story appears to be stereotypically Ottoman) in which a village that stands in the heart of Africa is inhabited by people for whom a beverage made for eggs is a necessity. A merchant arrives at the town with eggs and auctions them off for large blocks of money, as the natives very badly need their eggs. He returns each week with eggs, pricing them higher, and the natives end up giving him fortunes for the eggs, until one day, when they realise how they are letting the merchant get rich off of their gullibility, and cheat the system by having only one man (who requests 10 piastres for the whole cartload) appear at the next auction. The principals realise how they are having the same problems with their students that the Africans had with the eggs, and this system is abolished. Mein Herr's speech is interrupted for the narrator by stanzas of What Tottles Meant.

Chapters 14–15
Sylvie tells the story "Bruno's Picnic".

Chapter 16
Sylvie and Bruno have vanished. The guests, after a brief search, go home; Muriel, Arthur and the Earl discuss what pursuits might be followed in the Afterlife.

Chapter 17
Muriel sings To a Lark (which is replaced, for the dreaming narrator, by a different song). Arthur is called away to the harbour to treat cases of the deadly fever, and he leaves immediately after his wedding the next morning.

Chapter 18
An item in the Fayfield Chronicle reports the death of Arthur Forester.

==== The return ====
Chapter 19
In December of the same year, the narrator returns to Elveston, and visits Arthur's grave in the company of Muriel. They have tea with the Earl, and discuss whether animals have souls. Lady Muriel walks the narrator part of the way home, and they meet Sylvie and Bruno, who are singing A Song of Love.

Chapter 20
Back in Outland, the Professor welcomes Sylvie and Bruno back to the palace in time for Uggug's birthday celebrations. They hear the last verse of the Gardener's Song, then hurry to the Saloon.

Chapter 21
The Professor delivers his Lecture. It includes Axioms, Specimens, and Experiments. Part of the Specimens involve shrinking an elephant to the size of a mouse with the use of a Megaloscope, and reversing the Megaloscope to enlarge a flea to the size of a horse. One experiment involves the subject of Black Light by taking a candle and pouring black ink over the flame and turning the flame's yellow light to black light, which admittedly looks no different than no light at all.

Chapter 22
(The narrator visits the tramp mentioned in vol. 2, ch. 2.) The Banquet takes place.

Chapter 23
The Other Professor recites The Pig-Tale. The Emperor is in the process of making a speech when a mysterious "hurricane" causes him and his wife to regret all of their previous intrigues against the Warden. (No attempt is made to justify this in the terms of the story.)

Chapter 24
The Beggar returns to the palace, and is revealed to be the Warden. Uggug, who has turned into a giant porcupine, is put into a cage. Sylvie and Bruno visit the ill Professor in the company of the Empress.

Chapter 25
In the "real" world, the narrator is called urgently to the Hall. Eric Lindon has found Arthur Forester still living—he had been unconscious or delirious for several months, and went unrecognised as the doctor. On returning to his own lodgings, the narrator witnesses his last scene from Outland: Bruno and Sylvie discover that the two Jewels (vol. 1, ch. 6) are in fact one.

== Characters ==
=== Lead characters ===
The Historian (narrator)
An ill Londoner who visits Elveston to consult his doctor friend about his illness (possibly narcolepsy). While never given a name (he is referred to as "the Historian" by Carroll in the Preface to Sylvie and Bruno Concluded, and is called "Mister Sir" by Bruno) this character serves a supporting role in every plotline in the novel, and the story is told through his eyes. At first, he serves principally as an omniscient observer in Fairyland, although his part in the real-world story is somewhat more substantial. However, towards the middle of the novel, he begins to take on a more active role in both dimensions of the story.
Sylvie
Lady Sylvie is a young Sprite at the beginning of the novel, and later a true Fairy. Sylvie is the princess of Fairyland, daughter of the Warden, and sister of Bruno. While exhibiting very innocent traits, she seems far more mature than her younger brother, and often becomes exasperated with his illogical statements.
Bruno
Bruno, Esquire is a very young fairy child, who uses broken grammar and who seems to have a somewhat twisted view of logic. He abhors his lessons, which his sister makes him take on a daily basis.

=== Characters in the fairy world ===
The Warden
Later the King of Fairyland. The father of Sylvie and Bruno, and the rightful ruler of Outland. He is the intended victim of the plots of the Emperor, Empress, and Lord Chancellor, but is actually in full control of events.
Sibimet
Sibimet ("Sibby"), Sub-Warden of Outland (later Vice-Warden and then Emperor) conspires along with his wife and the Chancellor to steal the rule of Outland from the Warden. He is a rather ridiculous character, but not unintelligent. Sibimet means "for himself" in Latin, and Carroll congratulates himself in the Preface to Sylvie and Bruno Concluded on inventing such an apposite name.
Tabikat
Tabikat ("Tabby"), Sub-Wardeness of Outland (later Vice-Wardeness and then Empress) is the wife of Sibimet; she is an entirely stupid woman, and is unknowingly the butt of many jokes. She is content to spend all her time doting over her hideous son, Uggug.
The Lord Chancellor
The chief underling of the Emperor and Empress, he frequently is a willing conspirator in their dirty work.
Uggug
An ugly and stupid child who is doted upon and spoiled by his mother, and behaves in an obnoxious manner toward everyone. Later becomes His Imperial Fatness Prince Uggug. He changes into a porcupine near the end.
The Professor
A delightfully ridiculous old man, he invents many ridiculous items, and then has no purpose for them. The most wonderful item in his possession is the Outlandish Watch (so-called because it comes from Outland). It has the ability to turn back time, although it cannot allow its holder to truly alter events of the past. It can also play any one hour backwards.
The Other Professor
A Professor friend of the Professor. He is frequently asleep, and wakes up to recite poetry. In Furniss' illustrations, his face is never shown.

=== Characters in the real world ===
Dr Arthur Forester
An intelligent, thoughtful, curious young doctor. He often stimulates the storyline—and the other characters—by introducing questions of morality and religion. He is in love with Lady Muriel. He is an extremely moral person, and eventually sacrifices himself to save a village dying of fever.
Lady Muriel Orme
Another intelligent person, she is the object of Arthur's affection, and often helps to engage in intelligent conversation with many of the other real-world characters, especially the Narrator and the Earl. She endures a failed engagement with Eric Lindon, before marrying Arthur.
The Earl of Ainslie
The father of Lady Muriel, he is both a father figure to the younger characters, and a comrade to the ageing Narrator.
Eric Lindon
Lady Muriel's cousin, and one-time fiancé. He breaks their engagement upon realising that she believes that they are religiously incompatible, but will not break it herself. An ex-soldier, he exhibits great self-sacrifice and courage.
Mein Herr
Seemingly a traveller from a distant planet, "Mein Herr" (German for "my lord") is the catalyst for both satire and several puns. His planet has already experienced much of what Earth is currently dealing with, and he gladly shares the end results of some of our more ridiculous customs.

== Reception ==
Unlike Lewis Carroll's Alice books, Sylvie and Bruno has never been praised by critics. It sold just 13,000 copies in its early editions. "The Mad Gardener's Song", a poem that appears in instalments throughout the book, is often described as the only well-received part of the work.

The famous writer J. R. R. Tolkien was fond of the novel, and it is believed to have influenced his novella Roverandom.

The watch used by Sylvie and Bruno has been described as an early type of time machine, making Sylvie and Bruno an early example of time travel fiction; Lisa Yaszek noted that "The explosion of such stories during this era [1889 onward] might come from the fact that people were beginning to standardize time, and orient themselves to clocks more frequently."

In 2011, Richard Jenkyns of Prospect described Carroll's use of baby talk in the book as "embarrassing."

In 2014, Mari Ness wrote

Carroll abruptly shifts from one world to the other often without sense or reason or letting the reader know what’s going on. This is meant, I think, to convey the thin line between reality and dream, and to accent the narrator’s confusion—since he himself is often not at all sure what is going on. In practice, it comes across as muddled and annoying – mostly because the tones of the two narratives are so completely different. [...] Carroll seems to forget what he is writing, and where he is in the story. This might be deliberate, but that doesn’t quite explain apparent slip-ups such as the way the narrator suddenly knows Lady Muriel’s name before anyone has brought it up; the narration suddenly telling us Sylvie’s thoughts even though the narrator has no way of knowing what these thoughts are, not to mention this is distracting. Other bits leap from here to there without much meaning or connection or recollection of what happened earlier [...] Carroll later noted that he wrote the rest of the book in odd moments here and there, more or less jotting them down when he thought of scenes. This is all very well, but what Carroll blatantly forgot to do was to try to connect all of these odd moments.

Ness does praise some aspects, such as the Professor's Lecture, and says that "here and there I can catch glimpses of the zany, surreal humor of the Alice books. But even at their best moments, and there are few of those, the Sylvie and Bruno books never really hit those heights." She noted the similarities to George MacDonald's Adela Cathcart (1864) and posited that the failure of Sylvie and Bruno caused other authors not to attempt to write similar books aimed at both a child and adult audience.

Writing in The Forward in 2015, Benjamin Ivry criticised what he saw as antisemitic content in Sylvie and Bruno, for example, the depiction of a tailor (a stereotypically Jewish occupation in Victorian England) who accepts the doubling of his payment owed every year.

== See also ==
- On Exactitude in Science

== Literature ==
- Carroll, Lewis (1982). The Complete, Fully Illustrated Works. Gramercy Books. ISBN 0-517-14781-5.
- Carroll, Lewis (2015). Ray Dyer (ed.). Sylvie and Bruno with Sylvie and Bruno Concluded: An Annotated Scholar's Edition 1–2. Kibworth: Trouvador. ISBN 978-1-78462-397-5.
