= G. E. Farrow =

British children's writer

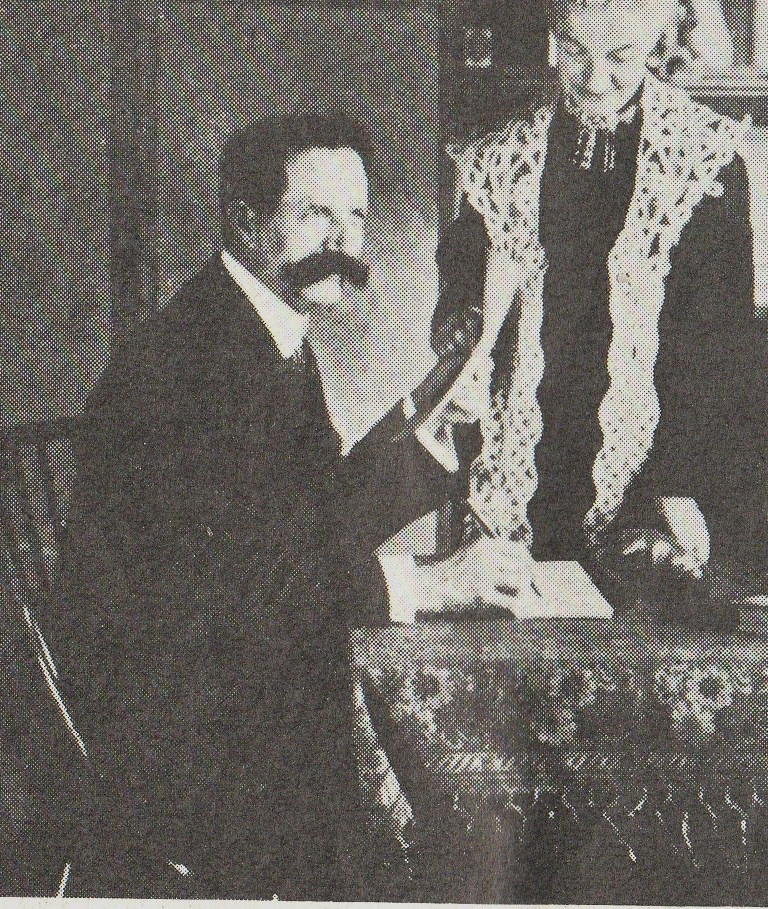
G.E. Farrow with his mother

George Edward Farrow (17 March 1862 – 1919) born in Ipswich in England, was a noted British children's book author of whose life little is known.

== Early life ==
The son of George Farrow, a cement manufacturer in Ipswich, and his wife Emily, G.E. Farrow was educated in London and America. In 1891 he was working as a clerk to the Collector of Inland Revenue and was living at No 190 Dalston Lane in Hackney. In 1901 he was living at No 83 Sterndale Road in Hammersmith. By this time his occupation is listed as author. On both these dates his mother was living with him. He also lived for a time in Brook Green, West Kensington.

== Books for children ==
During his literary career Farrow wrote more than 30 books for children. He encouraged his readers to write to him, answered their letters, and let their tastes and opinions guide his future works (rather like his American contemporary L. Frank Baum). Though he wrote adventure tales and poetry, Farrow was best known for nonsense books written in the tradition of Lewis Carroll's Alice's Adventures in Wonderland, especially his Wallypug series, including:

- The Wallypug of Why (1895)
- Adventures in Wallypugland (1898)
- The Wallypug in London (1898)
- In Search of the Wallypug (1903)
- The Wallypug in Fogland (1904)
- The Wallypug in the Moon (1905)

He wrote 34 volumes in all, his last being The Mysterious Shin Shira (1915).

== Sparse facts on life ==
Surprisingly for a popular and prolific author, little is known of Farrow's life. A few sparse facts can be gleaned from prefaces to his books: that he owned an armchair called Pendennis, had a dog called Gip, and was known to his friends as "Gef". It can be inferred, perhaps, from the prefaces, in which he repeatedly begged for readers' letters, that he was lonely and childless. The frequency with which he changed publishers points to dissatisfaction with the terms they offered. Until recently, even the year of his birth was not known for certain, (Note: Discovered by researcher Glenn Christodoulou.) it having been estimated at 1866, partly based on a reference in the Preface to an 1898 book:

One of my correspondents, aged eight, has embarrassed me very much indeed by suggesting that I should "wait for her till she grows up," as she should "so like to marry a gentleman who told stories." I hope she didn't mean that I did anything so disgraceful; and besides, as it would take nearly twenty-five years for her to catch up to me, she might change her mind in that time, and then what would become of me?

What did become of Farrow is also obscure. Author Noel Streatfeild has speculated:

I think he must have met a Snark who turned out to be a Boojum, for he certainly has "softly and suddenly vanished away."

Farrow's other books include The Missing Prince (1896) and The Little Panjandrum's Dodo (1899).
