= Elinor Mead Howells =

American architect

- Born: Elinor Gertrude Mead; May 1, 1837; Chesterfield, New Hampshire
- Died: May 6, 1910 (aged 73)
- Occupation: Architect
- Buildings: William Dean Howells House

Elinor Mead Howells (May 1, 1837 – May 6, 1910) was an American artist, architect and aristocrat. She was married to author William Dean Howells and designed the William Dean Howells House in Cambridge.

== Early life and family ==
Elinor Gertrude Mead was born on May 1, 1837, in Chesterfield, New Hampshire, to Mary Jane Noyes and Larkin Goldsmith Mead. Her family was part of the intellectual and social aristocracy of New England. Her brothers were sculptor Larkin Goldsmith Mead (born 1835) and architect William Rutherford Mead (born 1846). Future President Rutherford B. Hayes was her cousin and Oneida Community founder John Humphrey Noyes was her uncle. She graduated from Brattleboro High School in Brattleboro, Vermont.

During the winter of 1860, Mead travelled to Columbus to stay with Laura Platt, a niece of Hayes'. She met author William Dean Howells there. She went to London with her brother with the intent of marrying William. After learning that a week's residence would be required, the pair traveled to Paris where they married on December 24, 1862. Their children were Winifred (b. 1863), architect John Mead Howells (b. 1868), and Mildred (b. 1872). William Howells held a consulship in Venice from 1861 to 1865 and the couple lived there. The Howells moved to Cambridge, Massachusetts, in 1866 and lived in a house a few blocks north of Harvard University.

== William Dean Howells House and travels ==
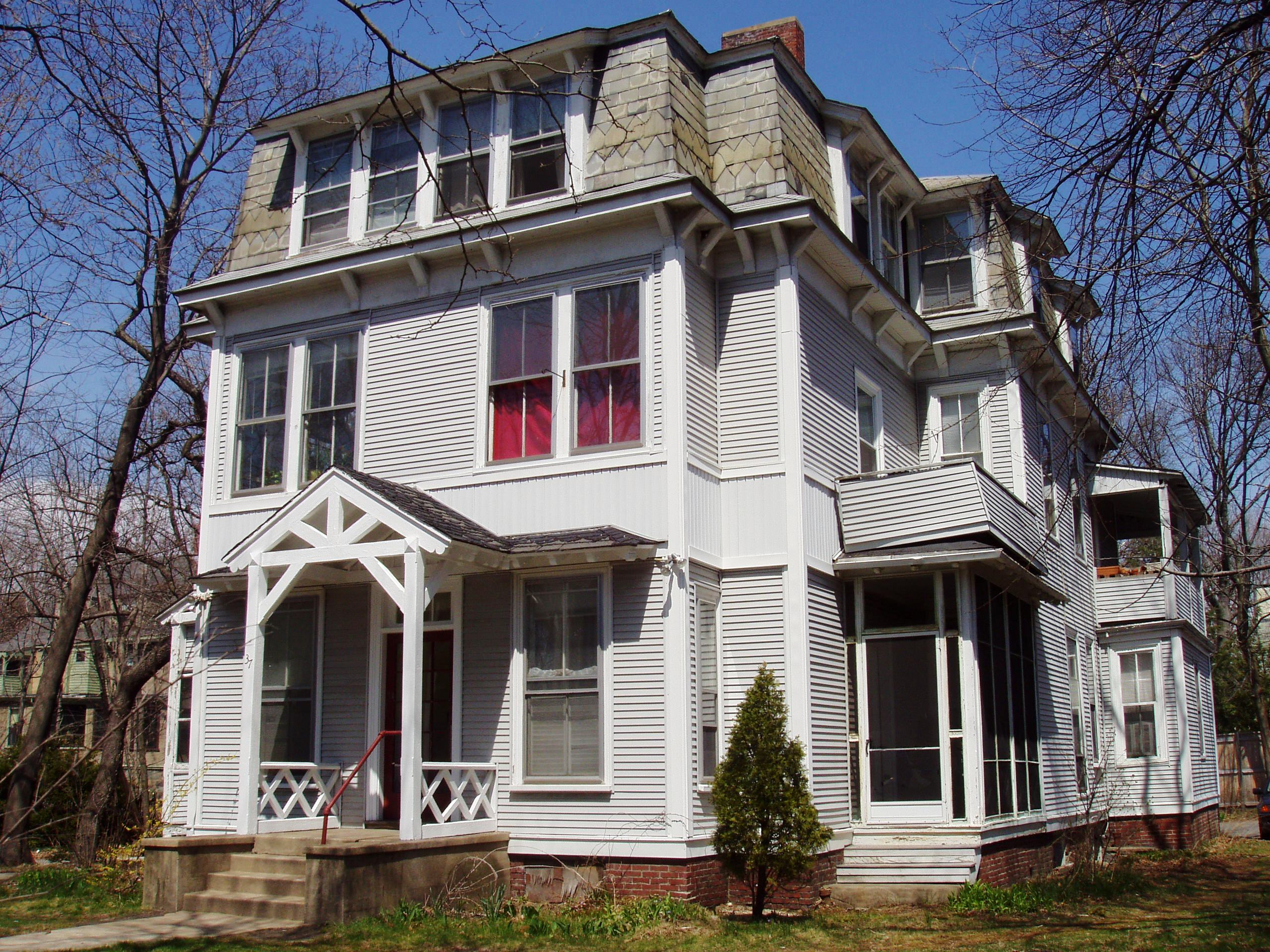
The William Dean Howells House in Cambridge, Massachusetts was designed by Elinor Howells and occupied by her family from 1873 to 1878.

Elinor Howells was the architect and interior designer for the William Dean Howells House located at 37 Concord Avenue. Their family moved into the home on July 7, 1873. Howells and her husband agreed it was "the prettiest house in Cambridge" and intended to live there for the rest of their lives. Following her husband's success as a writer, authors including Samuel Langhorne Clemens, Henry James, Henry Wadsworth Longfellow, James Russell Lowell, Bret Harte, and Thomas Bailey Aldrich visited their home, as did President James Garfield. Elinor Howells' judgments on fiction were respected by her husband and his circle. She saw both Samuel Clemens and Henry James frequently, corresponding often with Clemens as well as Susan Warner, the spouse of essayist Charles Dudley Warner.

The Howells family left Cambridge in 1878 and moved to Redtop in Belmont, Massachusetts. They travelled to Europe in 1882 and relocated frequently thereafter. By 1900, they had purchased a home near Gloucester, Massachusetts.

== Death and legacy ==
Howells had lifelong health problems. In February 1910, she began using morphine to treat her worsening neuritis. She died on May 6, 1910, in New York.

Around 200 of Elinor Howells' letters are extant. The 1988 book If Not Literature: Letters of Elinor Mead Howells includes 130 of her letters.
