= William Dean Howells House =

William Dean Howells House may refer to:

- William Dean Howells House (Cambridge, Massachusetts), listed on the National Register of Historic Places in Cambridge, Massachusetts
- William Dean Howells House (Kittery Point, Maine), listed on the National Register of Historic Places in York County, Maine
