= List of National Historic Landmarks in Massachusetts =

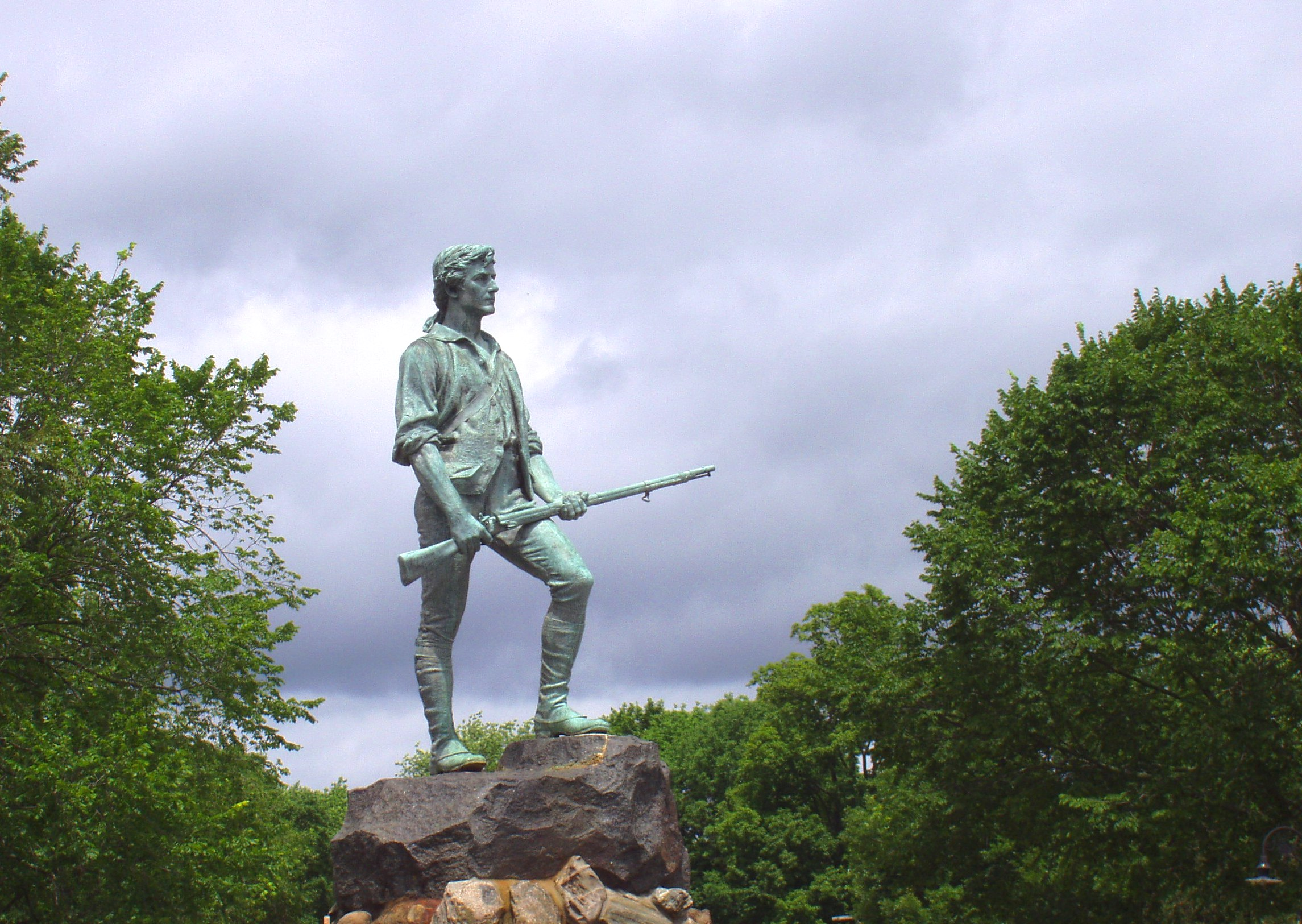
Minute Man statue on the Lexington Green in Lexington, where the first skirmishes of the American Revolutionary War occurred. Many of Massachusetts' National Historic Landmarks relate to the Revolutionary War and early American history.

The Commonwealth of Massachusetts has a total of 192 National Historic Landmarks (NHLs) within its borders. This is the second highest statewide total in the United States after New York, which has more than 250. Of the Massachusetts NHLs, 57 are in the state capital of Boston, and are listed separately. Ten of the remaining 134 designations were made when the NHL program was formally inaugurated on October 9, 1960; the most recent were in 2021. Cambridge is the city with the most NHLs outside Boston (at 19), and Middlesex County is home to 43 NHLs (again outside the 58 from Boston, which comprise all but two of the NHLs in Suffolk County). Every county in the state has at least one NHL (Franklin County has exactly one, the Old Deerfield Historic District).

The state's NHLs were chosen for a diversity of reasons. Some of the nation's oldest surviving structures are included: a number of 17th-century houses are listed, including the Fairbanks House (late 1630s) of Dedham, which is the oldest timber-frame house in the nation. The Old Ship Church (1681) of Hingham is the nation's oldest church still used for religious purposes, and Cole's Hill in Plymouth was used in 1620 as a burial ground for the Plymouth Colony. The Nauset Archeological District documents early contact between Europeans and Native Americans, and the Old Deerfield Historic District encompasses a well-preserved colonial frontier village.

Sites associated with the American Revolution and people of the time are on the list. The Lexington Green, Buckman Tavern, and the Hancock–Clarke House all played roles in the Battles of Lexington and Concord that began the American Revolutionary War, as did Wright's Tavern in Concord. The homes of Continental Army generals Benjamin Lincoln, John Glover, and Rufus Putnam are listed. Properties occupied by army officers during the Siege of Boston include the Longfellow House (occupied by George Washington and purchased by Henry Wadsworth Longfellow in part because of that association), and the Isaac Royall House. The Bunker Hill Monument commemorates the site of the Battle of Bunker Hill.

In addition to the Longfellow site, there are numerous NHLs with literary and artistic connections. Arrowhead in the Berkshires was where Herman Melville did much of his writing, and Concord is home to Walden Pond, the Ralph Waldo Emerson House, The Old Manse (home to Ralph Waldo Emerson's grandfather), Orchard House (childhood home to Louisa May Alcott), and The Wayside (home to Nathaniel Hawthorne). Hawthorne is also represented by the House of Seven Gables district of Salem, which includes his birthplace. Other literary landmarks include the John Greenleaf Whittier House, The Mount (Edith Wharton's Lenox estate), and Redtop, the Belmont home of William Dean Howells which was the site of many literary gatherings.

Scientific and academic pursuits are represented in the list. Homes of mathematicians, scientists, and researchers appear on the list, as do sites noted for the events that took place there. The Blue Hill Meteorological Observatory in Milton is home to the nation's longest continuous weather record, and the Goddard Rocket Launching Site in Auburn was where rocketry pioneer Robert H. Goddard performed some of his tests.

== Key ==
	National Historic Landmark
^{†}	National Historic Landmark District
^{#}	National Historic Site, National Historical Park, National Memorial, or National Monument
^{*}	Delisted Landmark

== List ==
	Landmark name	Image	Date designated	Location	County	Description
1	Adams Academy	Adams Academy	April 19, 1994 (#74000379)	Quincy; 42°15′15″N 71°00′21″W	Norfolk	High Gothic building, built in 1871 to a design by William Robert Ware and Henry Van Brunt, for a preparatory school funded with a bequest of John Adams.
2	John Adams Birthplace	John Adams Birthplace	December 19, 1960 (#66000129)	Quincy; 42°14′20″N 71°00′13″W	Norfolk	This is the house in which United States President John Adams was born on October 30, 1735. It is now part of the Adams National Historical Park.
3	John Quincy Adams Birthplace	John Quincy Adams Birthplace	December 19, 1960 (#66000128)	Quincy; 42°14′22″N 71°00′12″W	Norfolk	President John Quincy Adams was born in this house, which is adjacent to the John Adams Birthplace; it is also part of the Adams National Historical Park.
4	Adventure	Adventure	April 19, 1994 (#89002054)	Gloucester; 42°36′32″N 70°39′21″W	Essex	This schooner is one of the last surviving Gloucester-based Grand Banks fishing schooners, and one of only two surviving "knockabout" fishing schooners.
5	John and Priscilla Alden Family Sites	John and Priscilla Alden Family Sites	October 6, 2008 (#78000476)	Duxbury; 42°02′42″N 70°41′09″W	Plymouth	These two sites in Duxbury are associated with John and Priscilla Alden, who were the inspiration for Henry Wadsworth Longfellow's The Courtship of Miles Standish.
6	American Antiquarian Society	American Antiquarian Society	October 18, 1968 (#68000018)	Worcester; 42°16′41″N 71°48′35″W	Worcester	This 1910 Georgian Revival building houses the American Antiquarian Society, the third oldest (1812) historical society in the United States and the first to be national in scope.
7	Arrowhead (Herman Melville House)	Arrowhead (Herman Melville House)	December 29, 1962 (#66000126)	Pittsfield; 42°24′55″N 73°14′56″W	Berkshire	This 18th-century farmhouse was the home of author Herman Melville (1819–1891) during his most productive years from 1850 to 1863. He wrote several novels here, including Moby-Dick, as well as short stories, magazine stories and poetry. The house is now a museum.
8	Maria Baldwin House	Maria Baldwin House	May 11, 1976 (#76000272)	Cambridge; 42°22′12″N 71°06′01″W	Middlesex	This 19th century duplex was the home of educator Maria Louise Baldwin (1856–1922), the first female African-American principal of a school in New England.
9	Beauport	Beauport	May 27, 2003 (#03000641)	Gloucester; 42°35′28″N 70°39′38″W	Essex	Seminal interior designer and decorator Henry Davis Sleeper (1878–1934) used this Shingle-style as a showcase of his work. It is owned by Historic New England and operated as a museum.
10	Edward Bellamy House	Edward Bellamy House	November 11, 1971 (#71000091)	Chicopee Falls; 42°09′22″N 72°35′03″W	Hampden	This was the longtime home of journalist and social activist Edward Bellamy (1850–1898), author of the utopian novel Looking Backward.
11	George D. Birkhoff House	George D. Birkhoff House	January 15, 1975 (#75000295)	Cambridge; 42°22′42″N 71°07′43″W	Middlesex	This house was the home of George David Birkhoff (1884–1944), a leading mathematician of the early 20th century.
12	Blue Hill Meteorological Observatory	Blue Hill Meteorological Observatory	December 20, 1989 (#80000665)	Milton; 42°12′43″N 71°06′51″W	Norfolk	Described as "principal structure associated with the history of weather observation" in the United States, this observatory is home to the oldest continuous weather record in North America, and is where numerous meteorological measurement and analysis techniques were developed.
13	Boardman House	Boardman House	November 5, 1961 (#66000131)	Saugus; 42°28′20″N 71°02′16″W	Essex	This house, whose early construction dates to the late 17th century, has remained little changed since the early 18th century. It is now a house museum operated by Historic New England.
14^{†}	Boston Manufacturing Company	Boston Manufacturing Company	December 22, 1977 (#77001412)	Waltham; 42°22′23″N 71°14′09″W	Middlesex	This building housed the eponymous company, founded in 1813 by businessman Francis Cabot Lowell, engineer Paul Moody, and others, for the manufacture of cotton textiles. At this site the manufacture of textiles under a single roof was proved, a major success leading to the American Industrial Revolution.
15	Nathaniel Bowditch Home	Nathaniel Bowditch Home	January 12, 1965 (#66000135)	Salem; 42°31′18″N 70°53′55″W	Essex	This Federalist house was the home of Nathaniel Bowditch (1773–1838), the founder of modern (19th century) navigation. It now serves as the headquarters of Historic Salem, Inc.
16	Louis Brandeis House	Louis Brandeis House	November 28, 1972 (#72000148)	Chatham; 41°40′16″N 69°59′00″W	Barnstable	Bought in 1922 by liberal United States Supreme Court Justice Louis Brandeis (1856–1941), this Cape style house (whose construction dates to the late 19th century) was used by the Brandeis family as a summer retreat.
17	Percy W. Bridgman House	Percy W. Bridgman House	May 15, 1975 (#75000298)	Cambridge; 42°22′45″N 71°07′43″W	Middlesex	This house served as the longtime home of Nobel Prize-winning physicist Percy W. Bridgman (1882–1961). His innovations in the field of high pressure physics made possible the development of synthetic diamonds.
18	Brookline Reservoir of the Cochituate Aqueduct	Brookline Reservoir of the Cochituate Aqueduct	February 27, 2015 (#15000278)	Brookline; 42°19′35″N 71°08′12″W	Norfolk	This property, in addition to the reservoir, includes the end gatehouse of the Cochituate Aqueduct, and an elaborately-decorated distribution gatehouse that includes one of the earliest known uses of wrought iron for staircases.
19	William Cullen Bryant Homestead	William Cullen Bryant Homestead	December 29, 1962 (#66000136)	Cummington; 42°28′17″N 72°56′26″W	Hampshire	This property was the boyhood home and later summer residence of poet and newspaper editor William Cullen Bryant (1794–1878). It is now owned by The Trustees of Reservations and operated as a house museum.
20	Buckman Tavern	Buckman Tavern	January 20, 1961 (#66000137)	Lexington; 42°26′57″N 71°13′47″W	Middlesex	The oldest of Lexington's inns (established c. 1690), local militiamen mustered here prior to the April 19, 1775, battles of Lexington and Concord that began the American Revolutionary War.
21^{†}	Cape Ann Light Station	Cape Ann Light Station	January 3, 2001 (#71000355)	Rockport; 42°38′12″N 70°34′30″W	Essex	Located on Thacher Island, this light station was established in 1771, and was the last founded in the colonial era. The two lighthouses were the first to mark a navigational hazard (Thacher Island); the current lighthouses were constructed in 1861, and are aligned on a north-south axis.
22	Parson Capen House	Parson Capen House	October 9, 1960 (#66000139)	Topsfield; 42°38′29″N 70°57′00″W	Essex	This circa 1683 house was home to Reverend Joseph Capen, Topsfield's minister for many years. It is one of the best preserved 17th-century houses in the United States. It is operated by the Topsfield Historical Society as a house museum.
23	Castle Hill	Castle Hill	August 5, 1998 (#77000183)	Ipswich; 42°41′06″N 70°46′45″W	Essex	This early 20th-century country estate is one of the finest of its type. The house was designed by architect David Adler of Chicago, and the landscaping was done by the Olmsted Brothers firm, among others. The estate is owned by The Trustees of Reservations, and is open to the public.
24	Christ Church	Christ Church	October 9, 1960 (#66000140)	Cambridge; 42°22′31″N 71°07′14″W	Middlesex	This church, designed by architect Peter Harrison and completed in 1761, served Cambridge Anglicans. Despite numerous alterations, the church has retained much its original 18th century character.
25	Jethro Coffin House	Jethro Coffin House	October 18, 1968 (#68000019)	Nantucket; 41°17′15″N 70°06′26″W	Nantucket	This saltbox house, built in 1686, is the oldest surviving residential structure on Nantucket. It is now owned by the Nantucket Historical Association, which operates it as a house museum.
26	Cole's Hill	Cole's Hill	October 9, 1960 (#66000142)	Plymouth; 41°57′20″N 70°39′46″W	Plymouth	Cole's Hill is the site of the burial ground of the Pilgrims. Those who died in the first winter of the Plymouth Colony (1620–1621) were buried there.
27	Converse Memorial Library	Converse Memorial Library	December 23, 1987 (#85002014)	Malden; 42°25′38″N 71°03′59″W	Middlesex	This public library building was the last such building designed by architect H. H. Richardson, and is counted among his greatest works.
28	Crane and Company Old Stone Mill Rag Room	Crane and Company Old Stone Mill Rag Room	May 4, 1983 (#83004376)	Dalton; 42°28′15″N 73°10′43″W	Berkshire	From 1844 to 1930 this building was used as part of Crane and Company's paper manufacturing process, and is one of the nation's oldest surviving paper manufacturing buildings; it now houses Crane's museum. Crane has since 1879 been the exclusive supplier of paper for United States paper currency.
29	Crane Memorial Library	Crane Memorial Library	December 23, 1987 (#72000143)	Quincy; 42°15′05″N 71°00′08″W	Norfolk	One of five public libraries designed by H. H. Richardson, he considered it to be one of his best designs. The building incorporates stained glass by John LaFarge and sculptural elements by Augustus Saint-Gaudens.
30	Paul Cuffe Farm	Paul Cuffe Farm	May 30, 1974 (#74000394)	Westport; 41°32′37″N 71°04′02″W	Bristol	This site was the home and farm of Paul Cuffee (1759–1817), a wealthy colonial-era African-American merchant. Cuffee was a leading advocate for minority rights in Massachusetts, and a promoter and funder of the resettlement of African-Americans to present-day Sierra Leone.
31	Caleb Cushing House	Caleb Cushing House	November 7, 1973 (#73000327)	Newburyport; 42°48′23″N 70°52′14″W	Essex	This fine Federalist house was the home of diplomat and United States Attorney General Caleb Cushing (1800–1879). Cushing is known for negotiating the 1844 Treaty of Wanghia, the first treaty between the United States and Qing China, and other diplomatic successes. The house now serves as the headquarters of the local historical society.
32	Reginald A. Daly House	Reginald A. Daly House	January 7, 1976 (#76000305)	Cambridge; 42°22′31″N 71°07′34″W	Middlesex	This Queen Anne style house was the longtime home of geologist and Harvard University professor Reginald Aldworth Daly (1871–1957). Daly was a pioneer in the application of physics and chemistry to the field of geology.
33	William M. Davis House	William M. Davis House	January 7, 1976 (#76000306)	Cambridge; 42°22′43″N 71°06′43″W	Middlesex	This house was home to geologist and geographer William Morris Davis (1850–1934). Davis was a leading figure in the development of the study of geology, founding the Association of American Geographers and developing the first model of the cycle of erosion.
34	Derby Summer House	Derby Summer House	November 24, 1968 (#68000020)	Danvers; 42°34′24″N 70°57′58″W	Essex	This is a rare example of an 18th-century American garden house. Designed in the 1790s by Samuel McIntire, it resided on the estate of Salem merchant Elias Hasket Derby until 1901, when it was moved to the Endicott family's Glen Magna Farms country estate. The estate, now owned by the Danvers Historical Society, is open to the public.
35	Emily Dickinson Home	Emily Dickinson Home	December 29, 1962 (#66000363)	Amherst; 42°22′34″N 72°30′52″W	Hampshire	This house was home of the reclusive poet Emily Dickinson (1830–1886) for most of her life. The house is now owned by Amherst College and is operated as a house museum.
36	W.E.B. Dubois Boyhood Homesite	W.E.B. Dubois Boyhood Homesite	May 11, 1976 (#76000947)	Great Barrington; 42°10′42″N 73°23′37″W	Berkshire	This site contains all that remains of the childhood home of African American intellectual and activist W. E. B. Du Bois (1868–1963). The property, which belonged to his family for over 200 years, is seasonally open to the public.
37	Mary Baker Eddy House	Mary Baker Eddy House	January 13, 2021 (#100006275)	Lynn; 42°27′50″N 70°56′06″W	Essex	Home of Christian Science founder Mary Baker Eddy between 1875-1882.
38^{†}	Elmwood	Elmwood	December 29, 1962 (#66000364)	Cambridge; 42°22′34″N 71°08′18″W	Middlesex	This 1760s Georgian house and estate was home to three historically important individuals: Massachusetts colonial Lieutenant Governor Thomas Oliver (who had the house built), Massachusetts Governor and US Vice President Elbridge Gerry, and poet James Russell Lowell, who gave the property its name. It now serves as the home of the Harvard University president.
39	Ralph Waldo Emerson Home	Ralph Waldo Emerson Home	December 29, 1962 (#66000365)	Concord; 42°27′28″N 71°20′36″W	Middlesex	This house was purchased by writer, poet, and philosopher Ralph Waldo Emerson (1803–1882) in 1835. It was where he wrote all of his major works, and was a major meeting point for Transcendentalists, including Bronson Alcott and Henry David Thoreau. It has been a house museum since 1930.
40	Ernestina (schooner)	Ernestina (schooner)	December 14, 1990 (#85000022)	New Bedford; 41°38′03″N 70°55′15″W	Bristol	Ernestina is the oldest surviving Grand Banks fishing schooner, and the only surviving 19th century fishing schooner built in Gloucester. Owned by the state and under the overall aegis of the New Bedford Whaling National Historical Park, she is in 2012 sidelined from her intended educational purpose by budget constraints and the need for repairs.
41	Fairbanks House	Fairbanks House	October 9, 1960 (#66000367)	Dedham; 42°14′37″N 71°10′03″W	Norfolk	Continuously owned by a single family since its construction in the late 1630s, this is probably the oldest timber-frame house in North America. It is now operated by Fairbanks Family in America, Inc., as a house museum.
42	Reginald A. Fessenden House	Reginald A. Fessenden House	January 7, 1976 (#76000950)	Newton; 42°20′25″N 71°10′16″W	Middlesex	Reginald Fessenden (1866–1932) was an inventor who worked for a time in Thomas Edison's workshop. His most notable inventions made possible the transmission of audio sounds via radio waves, and included many other radio-related innovations. This house was his last home; he was described in memoriam as "the greatest wireless inventor of the age".
43	First Church Of Christ, Lancaster	First Church Of Christ, Lancaster	December 30, 1970 (#70000897)	Lancaster; 42°27′19″N 71°40′27″W	Worcester	One of the finest churches designed by architect Charles Bulfinch, this building was constructed in 1816 and is occupied by a congregation whose history dates to 1653.
44	Flying Horses Carousel	Flying Horses Carousel	February 27, 1987 (#79000342)	Oak Bluffs; 41°27′27″N 70°33′26″W	Dukes	This carousel, one of two extant examples of the work of the Charles F. W. Dare Company, is the oldest operating platform carousel in the nation, and may be the oldest of any type (the Flying Horse Carousel of Watch Hill, Rhode Island, also built by the Dare Company, is possibly older).
45	Capt. R.B. Forbes House	Capt. R.B. Forbes House	November 13, 1966 (#66000651)	Milton; 42°15′53″N 71°03′55″W	Norfolk	Designed by Isaiah Rogers, this 1833 Greek Revival house was built by ship captain and China Trade merchant Robert Bennet Forbes and his siblings for their mother. Furnished and decorated with acquisitions Forbes made in China, it is now a house museum.
46^{†}	Daniel Chester French Home and Studio	Daniel Chester French Home and Studio	December 21, 1965 (#66000652)	Stockbridge; 42°17′06″N 73°21′06″W	Berkshire	Better known as Chesterwood, this was the summer home and studio of sculptor Daniel Chester French (1850–1931) from 1891 until his death. The estate was designed by French's collaborator Henry Bacon, and is now owned by the National Trust for Historic Preservation. It is open to the public on a seasonal basis.
47^{†}	Fruitlands	Fruitlands	May 30, 1974 (#74001761)	Harvard; 42°30′27″N 71°36′45″W	Worcester	Fruitlands was the site of a short-lived (1843–1844) Transcendentalist utopian community founded by Amos Bronson Alcott. The property was acquired by preservationist Clara Endicott Sears in 1910 and opened as the Fruitlands Museum four years later.
48	Margaret Fuller House	Margaret Fuller House	May 30, 1974 (#71000686)	Cambridge; 42°21′52″N 71°05′51″W	Middlesex	This was the birthplace and childhood home of Transcendentalist and feminist Margaret Fuller (1810–1850). Her Woman in the Nineteenth Century is one of the earliest statements of feminist thought.
49	Gardner-Pingree House	Gardner-Pingree House	December 30, 1970 (#70000541)	Salem; 42°31′20″N 70°53′28″W	Essex	Salem merchant John Gardner had this Federalist-style house built in 1804–05 by Samuel McIntire. It was the site of a notorious murder in 1841 that inspired Nathaniel Hawthorne and Edgar Allan Poe. It is now owned by the Peabody Essex Museum, which offers guided tours.
50	General John Glover House	General John Glover House	November 28, 1972 (#72001101)	Marblehead; 42°30′17″N 70°50′49″W	Essex	John Glover (1732–97) had this simple frame house built in 1762, and occupied until 1782. Glover, a wealthy Marblehead merchant, was an important military figure in the American Revolutionary War, leading the Marblehead Regiment early in the war as well as leading early efforts to establish the Continental Navy.
51	Goddard Rocket Launching Site	Goddard Rocket Launching Site	November 13, 1966 (#66000654)	Auburn; 42°12′59″N 71°48′46″W	Worcester	This site, located on a local golf course, is where rocket scientist Robert H. Goddard launched the first liquid-fueled rocket in 1926. The actual launch site is marked by a granite obelisk.
52	Gore Place	Gore Place	December 30, 1970 (#70000542)	Waltham; 42°22′24″N 71°12′45″W	Middlesex	A remnant of an estate that was once much larger, Gore Place preserves an excellent Federalist mansion built in 1806 for Christopher Gore, a Massachusetts governor and United States senator. The mansion was saved from destruction in 1935, and is now open to the public as a house museum.
53	John B. Gough House	John B. Gough House	May 30, 1974 (#74001763)	Boylston; 42°19′31″N 71°45′14″W	Worcester	This Italianate house, also known as "Hillside", was the home of orator John B. Gough (1817–86), a leading figure of the 19th century temperance movement. The estate, owned by the town of Boylston, is undergoing a lengthy restoration and conservation process.
54	Asa Gray House	Asa Gray House	January 12, 1965 (#66000655)	Cambridge; 42°23′00″N 71°07′41″W	Middlesex	This Federalist house, designed by Ithiel Town and built in 1810, most notably served as the longtime home of botanist and Harvard professor Asa Gray (1810–1888). Gray was one of the most important botanists of the 19th century, publishing works still referenced today and defending Charles Darwin's On the Origin of Species.
55	Gropius House	Gropius House	May 16, 2000 (#00000709)	Lincoln; 42°25′37″N 71°19′37″W	Middlesex	Bauhaus architect Walter Gropius designed this house in 1937 as a personal expression of Modernism, living in it until his death in 1969. Owned by Historic New England and operated as a house museum, it contains the most important collection of Bauhaus artifacts outside Germany.
56^{†}	H. H. Richardson Historic District of North Easton	H. H. Richardson Historic District of North Easton	December 23, 1987 (#87002598)	North Easton; 42°04′01″N 71°06′17″W	Bristol	This landmark district contains five buildings in Easton designed by architect H. H. Richardson and landscaped by Frederick Law Olmsted, primarily through the efforts of the wealthy Ames family: Oakes Ames Memorial Hall, the Ames Free Library, the Old Colony Railroad Station, and two nearby structures on the Langwater estate of Frederick Lothrop Ames.
57	Hamilton Hall	Hamilton Hall	December 30, 1970 (#70000543)	Salem; 42°31′11″N 70°53′58″W	Essex	Named for Federalist Party leader Alexander Hamilton, this 1805 building was designed by Samuel McIntire to serve Salem's Federalist Party activities. It has been described as "one of the most outstanding Federal-era public buildings" in the nation.
58	Hancock–Clarke House	Hancock–Clarke House	July 17, 1971 (#71000895)	Lexington; 42°27′13″N 71°13′42″W	Middlesex	This 1737 house was the boyhood home of Revolutionary leader John Hancock, and was where he and Samuel Adams hid from British authorities at the outbreak of the American Revolutionary War. It is now owned by the Lexington Historical Society, and is seasonally open to the public.
59^{†}	Hancock Shaker Village	Hancock Shaker Village	October 18, 1968 (#68000037)	Hancock and Pittsfield; 42°25′48″N 73°20′20″W	Berkshire	This Shaker village was established in 1791 and lasted until 1960, after which it became a living history museum. It is noted for its distinctive round barn, built in 1826.
60	Oliver Hastings House	Oliver Hastings House	December 30, 1970 (#70000681)	Cambridge; 42°22′35″N 71°07′33″W	Middlesex	This Greek Revival house was built in 1844 as the home of Cambridge businessman Oliver Hastings (1791–1879). Although nearby resident Charles Sanders Peirce considered it "ugly", the building is recognized for its elegant curved bays and elaborate wrought iron balcony railings.
61	Oliver Wendell Holmes House	Oliver Wendell Holmes House	November 28, 1972 (#72001301)	Beverly; 42°33′50″N 70°48′24″W	Essex	This 1877 frame house was the summer home of United States Supreme Court Associate Justice Oliver Wendell Holmes Jr. (1841–1935). Holmes is known for his longevity on the bench, and his opinions on freedom of speech.
62^{†}	House of the Seven Gables	House of the Seven Gables	March 29, 2007 (#73000323)	Salem; 42°31′19″N 70°53′05″W	Essex	Best known for its association with Nathaniel Hawthorne's novel of the same name, this 1668 house was also a key early preservation effort, successfully restored in the early 20th century by historian and preservationist Joseph Everett Chandler. The district, which includes several other historical buildings, has been operated ever since as a history museum.
63^{†}	Jacob's Pillow Dance Festival	Jacob's Pillow Dance Festival	May 27, 2003 (#03000644)	Becket; 42°15′52″N 73°07′05″W	Berkshire	Jacob's Pillow was founded in 1931 by Ted Shawn as a place to develop an all-male dance company. It has since trained generations of dance professionals of all types, and continues to stage productions every summer.
64	Nathan and Mary (Polly) Johnson properties	Nathan and Mary (Polly) Johnson properties	February 16, 2000 (#00000260)	New Bedford; 41°37′59″N 70°55′43″W	Bristol	These buildings, now housing the New Bedford Historical Society, belonged to a free African-American couple active in the abolitionist movement and the Underground Railroad. They notably took in activist Frederick Douglass after his escape from slavery.
65	USS Joseph P. Kennedy Jr. (destroyer)	USS Joseph P. Kennedy Jr. (destroyer)	June 29, 1989 (#76000231)	Fall River; 41°42′21″N 71°09′47″W	Bristol	The only surviving United States Navy Gearing-class destroyer, this vessel is named for Joseph P. Kennedy Jr. (the brother of future President John F. Kennedy) who was killed in action during World War II. It is on display at Fall River's Battleship Cove.
66^{†}	Kennedy Compound	Kennedy Compound	November 28, 1972 (#72001302)	Hyannis Port; 41°37′50″N 70°18′12″W	Barnstable	This compound consists of three residences, each belonging at some point to Joseph P. Kennedy Sr., diplomat and patriarch of the politically influential Kennedy family, or one of his sons: President John F. Kennedy, Attorney General Robert F. Kennedy, and Senator Edward M. Kennedy.
67^{#}	John F. Kennedy Birthplace	John F. Kennedy Birthplace	July 19, 1964 (#67000001)	Brookline; 42°20′49″N 71°07′24″W	Norfolk	Now a National Historic Site, this modest suburban house was the birthplace and childhood home of President John F. Kennedy (1917–1963).
68	Jeremiah Lee House	Jeremiah Lee House	October 9, 1960 (#66000766)	Marblehead; 42°30′13″N 70°51′05″W	Essex	Jeremiah Lee was the wealthiest merchant in Massachusetts in the 1760s, when he had this Georgian mansion built. The mansion is in a remarkable state of preservation, and is operated by the local historical society as a house museum.
69	Lexington Green	Lexington Green	January 20, 1961 (#66000767)	Lexington; 42°26′58″N 71°13′52″W	Middlesex	Lexington's town common, it was here that opening skirmish of the American Revolutionary War took place on April 19, 1775.
70	Liberty Farm	Liberty Farm	May 30, 1974 (#74002046)	Worcester; 42°16′49″N 71°51′34″W	Worcester	This house belonged to abolitionists and suffragists Abby Kelley Foster (1811–1887) and Stephen Symonds Foster (1809–1881), and was used by them as a site on the Underground Railroad. The property also featured prominently in the Fosters' refusal to pay property taxes because she was unable to vote.
71	General Benjamin Lincoln House	General Benjamin Lincoln House	November 28, 1972 (#72001303)	Hingham; 42°14′35″N 70°53′33″W	Plymouth	This well-preserved 18th-century house was the birthplace and lifelong home of Revolutionary War General and Massachusetts Lieutenant Governor Benjamin Lincoln (1733–1810). The house, which is not open to the public, remains in Lincoln family hands.
72	USS Lionfish (submarine)	USS Lionfish (submarine)	January 14, 1986 (#76002270)	Fall River; 41°42′18″N 71°09′43″W	Bristol	An intact Balao-class submarine, USS Lionfish served two tours of duty in the Pacific during World War II and served as a training vessel before being decommissioned and placed on display at Battleship Cove.
73	Arthur D. Little Inc., Building	Arthur D. Little Inc., Building	December 8, 1976 (#76001970)	Cambridge; 42°21′40″N 71°04′56″W	Middlesex	This unremarkable 1917 office building was the site of the nation's first successful independent consulting laboratory, Arthur D. Little. The company pioneered the idea of commercial laboratories as independent, profit-making businesses.
74	Henry Cabot Lodge Residence	Henry Cabot Lodge Residence	December 8, 1976 (#76001971)	Nahant; 42°25′17″N 70°54′38″W	Essex	Henry Cabot Lodge (1850–1924) was a lifelong resident of this house. Lodge, as United States Senator from Massachusetts, was a critical voice in foreign policy debates of the early 20th century; he supported a wider role for the United States on the world stage, but led the opposition to ratification of the 1919 Treaty of Versailles that ended World War I.
75^{#}	Longfellow House	Longfellow House	December 29, 1962 (#66000049)	Cambridge; 42°22′35″N 71°07′34″W	Middlesex	This 1759 Georgian house was used by George Washington as his residence during the 1775–76 Siege of Boston. In the 19th century it was purchased for poet Henry Wadsworth Longfellow (1807–1882) by his father-in-law, and is where Longfellow wrote many of his best-known works.
76^{†}	Lowell Locks and Canals Historic District	Lowell Locks and Canals Historic District	December 22, 1977 (#76001972)	Lowell; 42°38′44″N 71°19′12″W	Middlesex	Lowell was the nation's first major industrialized city. Its system of canals and waterworks was constructed between 1794 and 1848. Most of these were built to power the large number of industries that sprang up in Lowell during the early years of the American Industrial Revolution, and remain in remarkable condition despite their age.
77	Lowell's Boat Shop	Lowell's Boat Shop	June 21, 1990 (#88000706)	Amesbury; 42°50′31″N 70°54′49″W	Essex	Founded in 1793, this boatshop has been in continuous business ever since; it is where founder Simeon Lowell developed the stackable dory. The present buildings date from the 1860s.
78	Luna (tugboat)	Luna (tugboat)	April 11, 1989 (#83004099)	Chelsea; 42°23′11″N 71°02′30″W	Suffolk	The Luna, built in 1930, is the last surviving full-sized wooden ship-docking tug on the Gulf and Atlantic coasts of the United States. She was the world's first diesel-electric tugboat built for commercial service, and was a showpiece for Thomas Alva Edison's General Electric Corporation. In October 2015 she was docked in Chelsea, Massachusetts.
79	USS Massachusetts (battleship)	USS Massachusetts (battleship)	January 14, 1986 (#76002269)	Fall River; 41°42′24″N 71°09′47″W	Bristol	One of two surviving United States Navy South Dakota-class battleships, Massachusetts saw action in World War II, winning 11 battle stars. She is on display at Battleship Cove.
80	Massachusetts Hall, Harvard University	Massachusetts Hall, Harvard University	October 9, 1960 (#66000769)	Cambridge; 42°22′28″N 71°07′06″W	Middlesex	This building, now housing administrative offices and a freshman dormitory, is the oldest surviving building (1718–1720) on the campus of Harvard University, and the second oldest academic building in the nation.
81	Memorial Hall, Harvard University	Memorial Hall, Harvard University	December 30, 1970 (#70000685)	Cambridge; 42°22′34″N 71°06′54″W	Middlesex	Designed by William Robert Ware and Henry Van Brunt, this High Gothic hall was built in the 1870s as Harvard University's memorial to its fallen in the American Civil War. Its amenities include Annenberg Hall (a dining hall) and Sanders Theater, a performance space.
82	George R. Minot House	George R. Minot House	January 7, 1976 (#76001976)	Brookline; 42°19′06″N 71°08′14″W	Norfolk	George R. Minot (1885–1950) was awarded a Nobel Prize for his work finding a treatment for pernicious anemia, then a fatal disease. This 1920s suburban house was his home from 1929 until his death.
83	Mission House	Mission House	October 18, 1968 (#68000038)	Stockbridge; 42°17′00″N 73°18′57″W	Berkshire	This house was built in c. 1742 by Reverend John Sergeant, the first Christian missionary to the Stockbridge Indians. It is now owned and operated by The Trustees of Reservations as a house museum.
84	The Mount (Edith Wharton Estate)	The Mount (Edith Wharton Estate)	November 11, 1971 (#71000900)	Lenox; 42°19′52″N 73°16′55″W	Berkshire	Designed by writer Edith Wharton (1862–1937) and built in 1902, The Mount is where she wrote the bestselling novel The House of Mirth. It is now a house museum.
85^{†}	Mount Auburn Cemetery	Mount Auburn Cemetery	May 27, 2003 (#75000254)	Cambridge; 42°22′14″N 71°08′45″W	Middlesex	In an effort spearheaded by Dr. Jacob Bigelow, Mount Auburn Cemetery was laid out by Henry A. S. Dearborn in 1831 as "America's first garden cemetery". In addition to being the burial place of many famous Bostonians, it is known for its horticulture and as a birdwatching destination.
86^{†}	Nantucket Historic District	Nantucket Historic District	November 13, 1966 (#66000772)	Nantucket; 41°17′00″N 70°05′51″W	Nantucket	This listing, which encompasses the entire island of Nantucket, was made in recognition of Nantucket's well-preserved historical settlements (dating to the 17th century), and its importance as the world's preeminent whaling center in the early years of the 19th century.
87	Naumkeag	Naumkeag	March 29, 2007 (#75000264)	Stockbridge; 42°17′23″N 73°18′57″W	Berkshire	This Gilded Age mansion and country estate was designed by McKim, Mead & White, with landscaping by Fletcher Steele. Built in the 1880s for lawyer Joseph Choate, it was given by his daughter to The Trustees of Reservations, who operate it as a museum.
88^{†}	Nauset Archeological District	Nauset Archeological District	April 19, 1993 (#93000607)	Eastham; 41°49′08″N 69°57′46″W	Barnstable	This district, located within the southern portion of the Cape Cod National Seashore, encompasses sites containing substantial ancient settlements dating to at least 4,000 BC. Some of these sites were described in the chronicles of early European explorers.
89^{†}	New Bedford Historic District	New Bedford Historic District	November 13, 1966 (#66000773)	New Bedford; 41°38′07″N 70°55′27″W	Bristol	This district encompasses the historic center of the country's leading 19th century whaling center, including as contributing properties other historic landmarks.
90	Norfolk County Courthouse	Norfolk County Courthouse	November 28, 1972 (#72001312)	Dedham; 42°14′56″N 71°10′34″W	Norfolk	This Greek Revival courthouse was built in 1827 and expanded over the 19th century. It was site of the controversial Sacco-Vanzetti trial in 1921, and has changed little since then.
91^{†}	Old Deerfield Historic District	Old Deerfield Historic District	October 9, 1960 (#66000774)	Deerfield; 42°32′49″N 72°36′15″W	Franklin	This well-preserved 18th century colonial village was the site of numerous Indian raids, including a famous and well-documented attack in 1704. The village is administered by Historic Deerfield as a museum.
92	Old Manse	Old Manse	December 29, 1962 (#66000775)	Concord; 42°28′06″N 71°20′57″W	Middlesex	This 1770 Revolutionary-era house was home for a time to both Ralph Waldo Emerson (whose grandfather had it built) and Nathaniel Hawthorne; Henry David Thoreau was a guest of Hawthorne's. The house is now owned by The Trustees of Reservations and is open to the public.
93	Old Ship Meetinghouse	Old Ship Meetinghouse	October 9, 1960 (#66000777)	Hingham; 42°14′28″N 70°53′14″W	Plymouth	This Puritan meetinghouse was constructed in 1681 and is claimed to be the oldest church in the nation still used for religious services. Its name derives from its construction, which resembles an inverted wooden ship hull.
94^{#}	Frederick Law Olmsted House	Frederick Law Olmsted House	May 23, 1963 (#66000780)	Brookline; 42°19′32″N 71°07′56″W	Norfolk	Frederick Law Olmsted (1822–1903), one of America's leading landscape designers of his generation, lived and worked at this site for the last twenty years of his life. It is now a National Historic Site.
95	Orchard House	Orchard House	December 29, 1962 (#66000781)	Concord; 42°27′32″N 71°20′06″W	Middlesex	This early 18th-century house was the longtime home of Transcendentalist Amos Bronson Alcott (1799–1888). His daughter, writer Louisa May Alcott, set the novel Little Women here. It is now a house museum.
96	Robert Treat Paine House	Robert Treat Paine House	June 30, 1989 (#75000291)	Waltham; 42°23′07″N 71°13′40″W	Middlesex	Also known as Stonehurst, this city-owned estate was designed by H. H. Richardson with landscaping by Frederick Law Olmsted for Boston lawyer Robert Treat Paine Jr. (1835–1910). It is open to the public.
97	The Parsonage	The Parsonage	November 11, 1971 (#71000903)	Natick; 42°16′15″N 71°18′52″W	Middlesex	This 1824 house was home to the father of writer Horatio Alger (1832–99). Alger, a prolific and popular writer of juvenile fiction, frequently summered here.
98	Peabody Museum of Salem	Peabody Museum of Salem	December 21, 1965 (#66000783)	Salem; 42°31′18″N 70°53′33″W	Essex	Now embedded within the Peabody Essex Museum, the East India Marine Hall was built in the 1820s. The museum traces its lineage to the 1799 East India Marine Society, claiming to be the nation's oldest continuously operating museum.
99	Peirce-Nichols House	Peirce-Nichols House	October 18, 1968 (#68000041)	Salem; 42°31′21″N 70°53′59″W	Essex	This transitional Georgian/Federal style home was built in 1782 for merchant Jerathmiel Peirce by Samuel McIntire. The house is owned by the Peabody Essex Museum, which offers tours.
100	Lydia Pinkham House	Lydia Pinkham House	August 25, 2014 (#12000818)	Lynn; 42°28′33″N 70°57′03″W	Essex	This 1872 Second Empire house was the residence of Lydia Pinkham, whose homemade herbal remedy for dysmenorrhea was one of the bestselling such medical products of the late 19th century thanks to Pinkham's use of her own image as a marketing tool. Orders and other correspondence were received at the house's Western Avenue address; sometimes Pinkham wrote back personally, a practice continued by her company after her death.
101	PT 617	PT 617	December 20, 1989 (#89002465)	Fall River; 41°42′17″N 71°09′42″W	Bristol	The only surviving 80 feet (24 m) Elco torpedo boat from World War II, craft of this type were workhorses throughout many theaters of the war. This boat is on display at the PT Boat Museum in Battleship Cove.
102	PT 796	PT 796	January 14, 1986 (#86000092)	Fall River; 41°42′17″N 71°09′42″W	Bristol	This is one of three surviving Higgins PT boats, built late in World War II. It is on display at the PT Boat Museum in Battleship Cove.
103	General Rufus Putnam House	General Rufus Putnam House	November 28, 1972 (#72001330)	Rutland; 42°22′17″N 71°58′03″W	Worcester	Rufus Putnam (1738–1824) was a Continental Army officer in the American Revolutionary War. After the war he pioneered the settlement of the Northwest Territories, serving as its first Surveyor General. This house, built in the early 1760s, was his home in the 1780s. Although it was for a time a local museum, it is now a bed and breakfast.
104	Quincy Homestead	Quincy Homestead	April 5, 2005 (#70000095)	Quincy; 42°15′30″N 71°00′27″W	Norfolk	This house was built in 1686 as an early home of the Quincy family. Its well-preserved construction documents 300 years of architectural changes. The building was an early success in house preservation early in the 20th century, and is now a house museum.
105	Josiah Quincy House	Josiah Quincy House	September 25, 1997 (#97001274)	Quincy; 42°16′18″N 71°00′53″W	Norfolk	This house, built c. 1770, was occupied by a succession of politically active Quincys, and contains architectural details unique among houses from the period. It is owned by Historic New England, who offer infrequent tours during the summer months.
106	Red Top (William Dean Howells' House)	Red Top (William Dean Howells' House)	November 11, 1971 (#71000911)	Belmont; 42°24′01″N 71°10′46″W	Middlesex	William Dean Howells (1837–1920) was a major literary figure of the late 19th century, writing prolifically and editing the Atlantic Monthly. This house was designed by Howells' brother-in-law William Rutherford Mead (of McKim, Mead, and White), and was home to the Howellses 1878–1882. It was the site of gatherings involving many literary notables.
107	Revere Beach Reservation	Revere Beach Reservation	May 27, 2003 (#03000642)	Revere; 42°24′23″N 70°59′28″W	Suffolk	Revere Beach was the first oceanside beach purchased for public access (in 1895). Architect Charles Eliot was responsible for the design and layout of the beach's roadways and facilities. Managed by the Massachusetts Department of Conservation and Recreation, the reservation continues to provide public recreation facilities.
108	Theodore W. Richards House	Theodore W. Richards House	January 7, 1976 (#76001999)	Cambridge; 42°22′42″N 71°07′22″W	Middlesex	Theodore William Richards (1868–1928) was considered the foremost experimental chemist of his time. He won the Nobel prize for his role in determine the atomic weights of many elements. This house was built in 1900 with design input from Richards, and he lived there until his death.
109	William J. Rotch Gothic Cottage	William J. Rotch Gothic Cottage	February 17, 2006 (#06000236)	New Bedford; 41°37′50″N 70°55′57″W	Bristol	This early Gothic Revival cottage was designed by Alexander Jackson Davis in 1845 for William J. Rotch (1819–1893), scion of New Bedford's leading whaling family. It exhibits features not found in other surviving similar works by Davis, and received wide public notice after its construction. The cottage is a private residence and is not open to the public.
110	William Rotch Jr. House	William Rotch Jr. House	April 5, 2005 (#05000456)	New Bedford; 41°37′49″N 70°55′42″W	Bristol	This house was the first design of Richard Upjohn, a leading architect of the 19th century. He designed this Greek Revival home for William Rotch Jr. (1759–1850), the leading whaling businessman of the time. Later residents of the house were also leading New Bedford figures. The property is now a house museum.
111	Isaac Royall House	Isaac Royall House	October 9, 1960 (#66000786)	Medford; 42°24′43″N 71°06′41″W	Middlesex	This c. 1692 house was extensively expanded in the 18th century by merchant and slaveowner Isaac Royall Jr. It was occupied by John Stark during the 1775–76 Siege of Boston. A well-preserved Georgian house that is now a museum.
112	Count Rumford Birthplace	Count Rumford Birthplace	January 15, 1975 (#75001942)	Woburn; 42°30′27″N 71°09′40″W	Middlesex	Inventor and scientist Benjamin Thompson (1753–1814) was born in this well-preserved 1714 house. Thompson was lauded in Europe for his discoveries (including key advances in the field of thermodynamics); he received honors including the title Count Rumford. The house is now a museum.
113	Sampson-White Joiner Shop	Sampson-White Joiner Shop	December 11, 2023 (#100009826)	Duxbury; 42°01′19″N 70°44′42″W	Plymouth	The only known surviving 18th-century woodworking shop in its original setting with original fixtures.
114^{#}	Saugus Iron Works	Saugus Iron Works	November 27, 1963 (#66000047)	Saugus; 42°28′04″N 71°00′32″W	Essex	This National Historic Site preserves an early colonial ironworks, dating to 1646.
115	Sever Hall, Harvard University	Sever Hall, Harvard University	December 30, 1970 (#70000732)	Cambridge; 42°22′28″N 71°06′56″W	Middlesex	This mature work of H. H. Richardson is a classroom building. Richardson sought to integrate contemporary ideas of architecture into Harvard's largely Georgian campus.
116	Spencer-Pierce-Little House	Spencer-Pierce-Little House	October 18, 1968 (#68000043)	Newbury; 42°47′36″N 70°51′23″W	Essex	This house is a rare example of a 17th-century stone house in New England. Relatively unchanged despite additions over the centuries, it is now owned by Historic New England, who operate the site as a farm and museum.
117^{#}	Springfield Armory	Springfield Armory	December 19, 1960 (#66000898)	Springfield; 42°06′29″N 72°34′54″W	Hampden	Until 1968 this site was a part of the nation's first armories and weapons production facilities, and a major military research facility. It was a focal point of the 1787 Shays' Rebellion, a local uprising against oppressive state fiscal policies.
118	Joseph Story House	Joseph Story House	November 7, 1973 (#73001952)	Salem; 42°31′31″N 70°53′23″W	Essex	Joseph Story (1779–1845) was an influential United States Supreme Court Justice on the John Marshall court. Story's jurisprudence and legal thought were highly influential during his tenure on the court (1811–45). Story lived in this Federalist style home from 1811 to 1829.
119	Mary Fisk Stoughton House	Mary Fisk Stoughton House	June 29, 1989 (#89001246)	Cambridge; 42°22′34″N 71°07′29″W	Middlesex	This 1880s Shingle style home by H. H. Richardson was one of his last commissions, and the best surviving example of his work in that style. The house's residents included Harvard University professor and historian John Fiske.
120	Elihu Thomson House	Elihu Thomson House	January 7, 1976 (#76002002)	Swampscott; 42°28′11″N 70°55′06″W	Essex	Elihu Thomson (1853–1937) was an inventor and pioneer in the field of electrical engineering. Along with Thomas Alva Edison he founded General Electric. This 1889 Georgian Revival house was Thomson's home for many years; it now serves as Swampscott's town hall.
121	Peter Tufts House	Peter Tufts House	October 18, 1968 (#68000044)	Medford; 42°24′41″N 71°05′37″W	Middlesex	This house, whose construction date is uncertain but believed to be in the mid-to-late 17th century, is quite possibly the oldest brick house in North America. It was probably built by Peter Tufts (1628–1702), an early settler of Medford. It is owned by the Medford Historical Society, which seasonally offers tours.
122	United First Parish Church (Unitarian) Of Quincy	United First Parish Church (Unitarian) Of Quincy	December 30, 1970 (#70000734)	Quincy; 42°15′04″N 71°00′11″W	Norfolk	Alexander Parris designed this Greek Revival church in the 1820s for the oldest congregation in Quincy. Presidents John Adams and John Quincy Adams are buried here.
123	United States Customhouse	United States Customhouse	December 30, 1970 (#70000735)	New Bedford; 41°38′07″N 70°55′29″W	Bristol	This outstanding example of a public building in the Greek Revival style has been used as a customs facility since 1834.
124	University Hall, Harvard University	University Hall, Harvard University	December 30, 1970 (#70000736)	Cambridge; 42°22′28″N 71°07′02″W	Middlesex	Architect Charles Bulfinch designed, and engineer Loammi Baldwin Jr. constructed this Harvard College facility. Originally used for classes and dining, it now houses the administrative offices.
125	The Vale	The Vale	December 30, 1970 (#70000737)	Waltham; 42°23′02″N 71°13′49″W	Middlesex	Now more commonly called the Lyman Estate, this was the country estate of Boston merchant Theodore Lyman. Built in 1793, it includes one of the nation's oldest greenhouses, and has survived with most of its landscaping intact. It is open to the public.
126	Walden Pond	Walden Pond	December 29, 1962 (#66000790)	Concord; 42°26′18″N 71°20′31″W	Middlesex	Now part of a state reservation, Henry David Thoreau's cabin was located here. The time Thoreau spent here was inspiration for his conservationist treatise Walden.
127	John Ward House	John Ward House	October 18, 1982 (#68000045)	Salem; 42°31′22″N 70°53′30″W	Essex	Construction was begun on this house in 1684, with owner John Ward making several modifications to it prior to his death. The building, now owned by the Peabody Essex Museum, stands as a fine example of the organic growth of early colonial houses.
128	The Wayside, "Home of Authors"	The Wayside	December 29, 1962 (#80000356)	Concord; 42°27′32″N 71°19′59″W	Middlesex	This c. 1700 house, part of the Minuteman National Historical Park, was home to three writers in the 19th century: Louisa May Alcott, Nathaniel Hawthorne, and Margaret Sidney. The Park Service opens the house for tours seasonally.
129	Daniel Webster Law Office	Daniel Webster Law Office	May 30, 1974 (#74002053)	Marshfield; 42°04′17″N 70°40′21″W	Plymouth	Lawyer, politician, and orator Daniel Webster (1782–1852) used this 1832 cottage as his office and library. Originally located on his Marshfield estate, it is now on the grounds of the nearby Isaac Winslow House Museum.
130	Wesleyan Grove	Wesleyan Grove	April 5, 2005 (#05000458)	Oak Bluffs; 41°27′19″N 70°33′41″W	Dukes	Wesleyan Grove is a Methodist camp meeting established in 1835. Its grounds, which are open to the public, feature a large number of Victorian era gingerbread cottages. As one of the earliest camps of this type, its features were influential in the development of other permanent camp meeting facilities.
131^{†}	Western Railroad Stone Arch Bridges and Chester Factory Village Depot	Western Railroad Stone Arch Bridges and Chester Factory Village Depot	January 13, 2021 (#100006273)	Vicinity of Herbert Cross Road, Middlefield/Becket Line (Bridges and Roadbed); 10 Prospect Street (Depot); 42°18′20″N 73°00′19″W	Berkshire, Hampden, and Hampshire	1840s railroad engineering that proved the ability to cross mountainous terrain. Extends into Chester and Middlefield; includes a subset of the Middlefield-Becket Stone Arch Railroad Bridge District.
132	John Whipple House	John Whipple House	October 9, 1960 (#66000791)	Ipswich; 42°40′36″N 70°50′10″W	Essex	The earliest portions of this house date to 1642. It has been operated as a museum (now known as the Ipswich Museum) since the 1890s.
133	John Greenleaf Whittier Home	John Greenleaf Whittier Home	December 29, 1962 (#66000792)	Amesbury; 42°51′21″N 70°56′07″W	Essex	This house was the longtime home of poet and abolitionist John Greenleaf Whittier (1807–1892). It is now a house museum.
134	Winn Memorial Library	Winn Memorial Library	December 23, 1987 (#76000290)	Woburn; 42°28′45″N 71°09′16″W	Middlesex	This was the first public library building designed by H. H. Richardson; it was built between 1876 and 1879. It still houses Woburn's public library.
135	Wright's Tavern	Wright's Tavern	January 20, 1961 (#66000793)	Concord; 42°27′36″N 71°20′55″W	Middlesex	Wright's Tavern was used in October 1774 as the first meeting place of the Massachusetts Provincial Congress. In April 1775 it was the assembly point for Concord's Minutemen before the Battles of Lexington and Concord.

== See also ==
- List of areas in the National Park System in Massachusetts
- Adams National Historical Park
- Minute Man National Historical Park
- New Bedford Whaling National Historical Park
- Salem Maritime National Historic Site
- List of U.S. National Historic Landmarks by state
- National Register of Historic Places listings in Massachusetts
- List of National Natural Landmarks in Massachusetts
