= Old Cambridgeport Historic District =

Historic district in Massachusetts, United States

- U.S. National Register of Historic Places
- U.S. Historic district
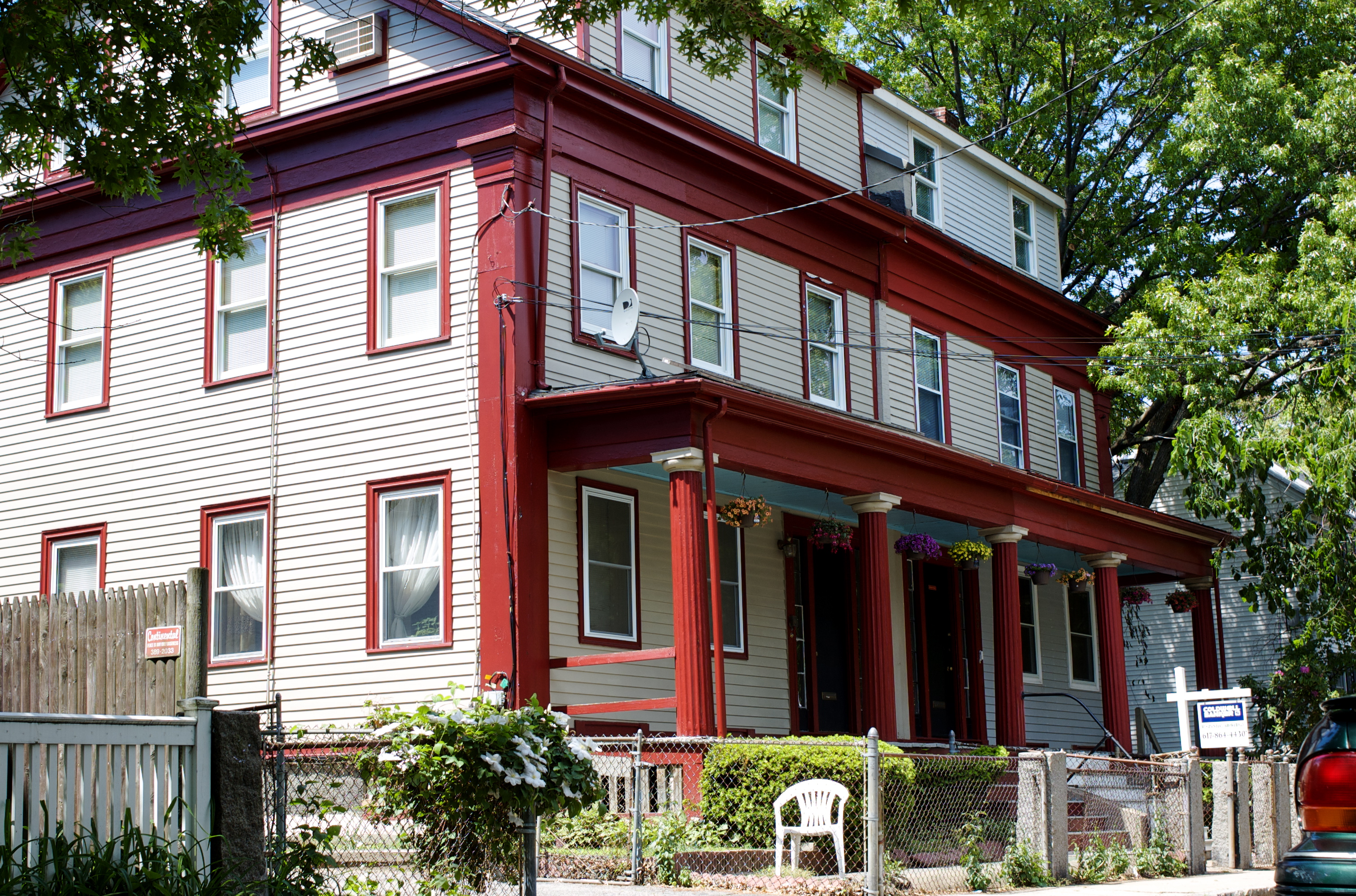

- Location within Massachusetts Location within the United States
- Location: Cambridge, Massachusetts
- Coordinates: 42°21′57″N 71°5′50″W
- Architectural style: Greek Revival, Late Victorian
- MPS: Cambridge MRA
- NRHP reference No.: 83000820
- Added to NRHP: June 30, 1983

The Old Cambridgeport Historic District is a historic district along Cherry, Harvard and Washington Streets in Cambridge, Massachusetts. It contains some of the oldest surviving houses north of Massachusetts Avenue in the Cambridgeport section of the city. It includes the entire block of Cherry Street between Harvard and Washington Streets, as well as a few buildings on those two streets. The oldest houses are the Samuel Fay House (172 Harvard Street, built 1805) and the Margaret Fuller House (71 Cherry Street, built 1807, now a National Historic Landmark).

The district was added to the National Register of Historic Places in 1983, where it is spelled "Cambridgport".

== See also ==
- National Register of Historic Places listings in Cambridge, Massachusetts
