= Edward Penniman House and Barn =

Historic house in Massachusetts, United States

- U.S. National Register of Historic Places
- U.S. Historic district – Contributing property
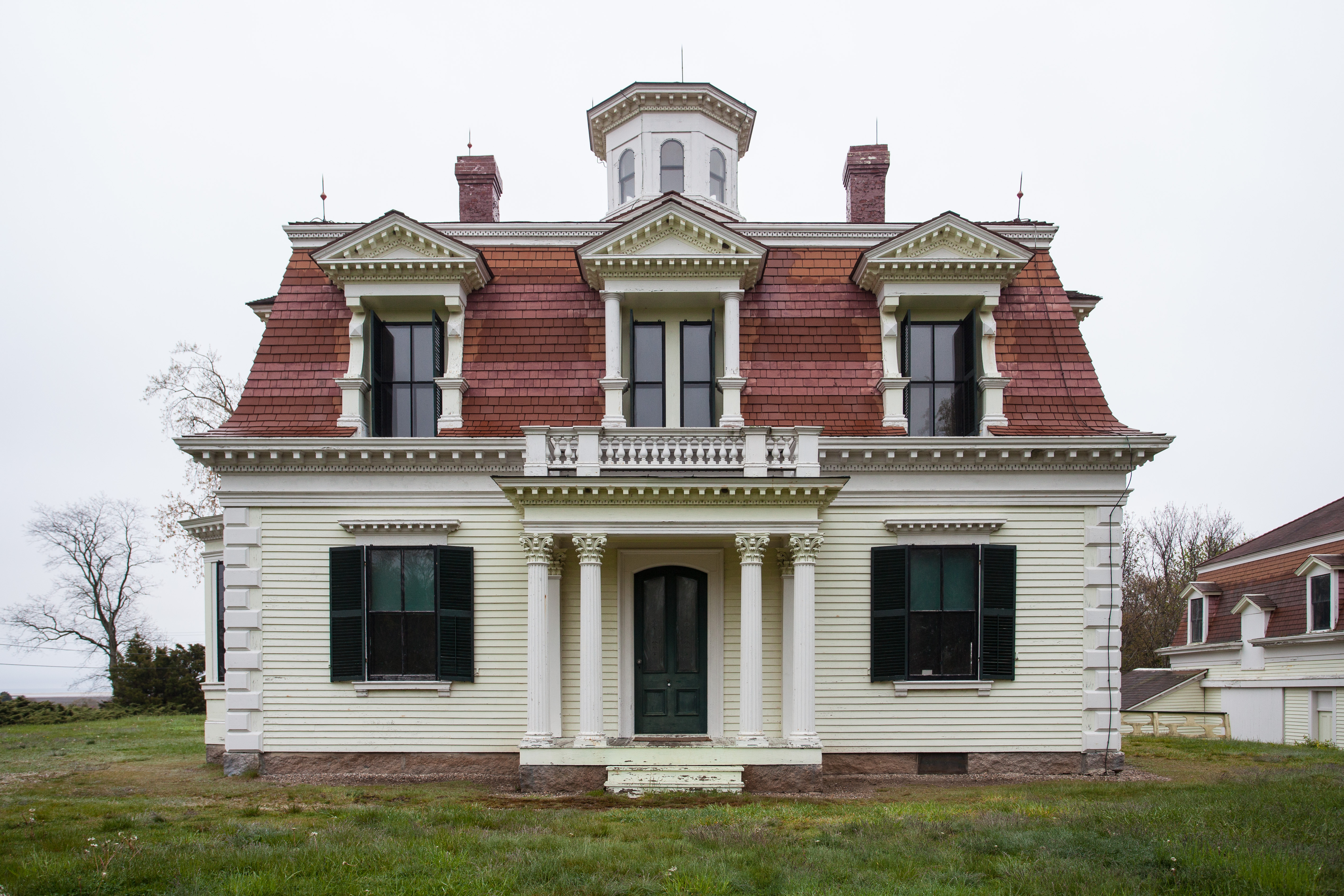
- Edward Penniman House

- Location within Cape Cod
- Nearest city: Eastham, Massachusetts
- Coordinates: 41°49′6.5″N 69°57′56.4″W
- Built: 1868
- Architectural style: Second Empire
- Part of: Fort Hill Rural Historic District (ID00001656)
- NRHP reference No.: 76000155

Significant dates
- Added to NRHP: May 28, 1976
- Designated CP: April 5, 2001

The Edward Penniman House and Barn is a historic site in Eastham, Massachusetts, on Fort Hill, which is currently protected by the Cape Cod National Seashore and home to Indian Rock.

The house was built in 1868 and added to the National Register of Historic Places in 1976.

== History ==
The house was built by Edward Penniman (1831–1913). Penniman was attracted by the profits to be made as a whaler, so he ran to sea at age eleven and became master of his own whaling ship by age 29. He took his wife with him on his travels, which lasted up to four years.

Penniman retired in 1868 and built this house with plans that he designed himself, including a modern toilet and bath with hot running water.

Irma Knowles Penniman Broun sold the Penniman estate to the Cape Cod National Seashore.

== National Park Service ==
The house is now on the Fort Hill Trail, which is kept up by the National Park Service.

== See also ==
- National Register of Historic Places listings in Cape Cod National Seashore
- National Register of Historic Places listings in Barnstable County, Massachusetts
