= Maria Baldwin House =

Historic house in Massachusetts, United States

- U.S. National Register of Historic Places
- U.S. National Historic Landmark
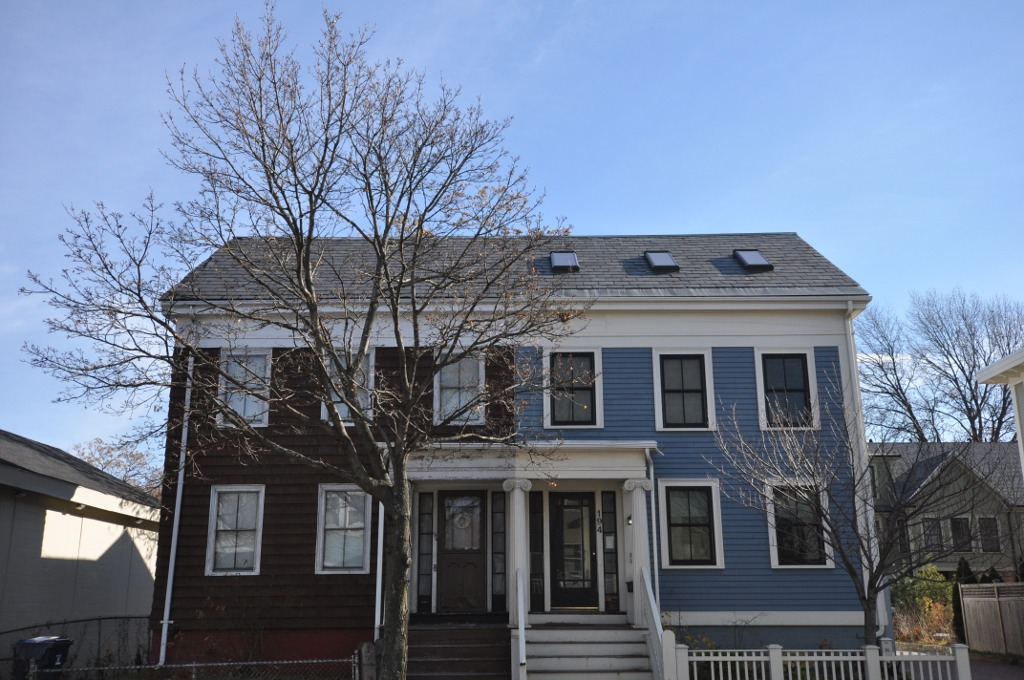
- The Maria Baldwin House is the left side of the duplex

- Location within Massachusetts
- Location: 196 Prospect Street, Cambridge, Massachusetts
- Coordinates: 42°22′12.6″N 71°06′00.6″W
- Area: less than one acre
- Built: c. 1840
- Architectural style: Greek Revival
- NRHP reference No.: 76000272

Significant dates
- Added to NRHP: May 11, 1976
- Designated NHL: May 11, 1976

The Maria Baldwin House is a National Historic Landmark located at 196 Prospect Street, Cambridge, Massachusetts, United States. The house is the northern half of a 19th-century two-family house, notable for its associations with educator Maria Louise Baldwin (1856–1922). It was her home when she served as the first female African-American principal in a Massachusetts school at Cambridge's Agassiz Grammar School (from 1916 onwards). As the schoolmaster, she supervised 12 teachers, all white, who presided over a 98% white student body. The Agassiz School has since been renamed the Maria Baldwin School in her honor. The Baldwin House was declared a National Historic Landmark in 1976.

== Description and history ==
The main block of the Baldwin House is a 2 1/2-story wood-frame structure resting on a brick foundation, with a side-gable roof. It is a duplex, a total of six bays in width, with a pair of doorways sheltered by portico supported by three Ionic columns. The doorways are flanked by sidelight windows and pilasters. The remaining bays are filled with two-over-two sash windows. There is a simple entablature below the main roofline, running around the house; the gable ends on the sides are fully enclosed. The house may originally have had corner pilasters, but there is now simple corner molding. To the rear of the house is a two-story kitchen ell, which is slightly lower than the main house due to lower interior ceiling heights on each level. The house is dated to the 1840s based on architectural analysis.

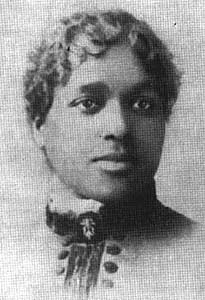
Maria Louise Baldwin

Maria Baldwin was born in Cambridge in 1856, graduated from its public schools in 1874, and received a degree from the Cambridge Teachers' Training School the following year. Under pressure from the local African-American community, the Cambridge school administration offered her a teaching position in 1881. She was assigned to the Agassiz School, near Harvard University, and rose to become its master in 1916. At that time she was the first black woman in New England to hold such a high educational position, and was one of only two female masters in the Cambridge schools. The Agassiz School had an almost entirely white student population, and all of its teachers were white.

Baldwin moved into the northern half of the duplex at 194-196 Prospect Street in 1892, and lived there until her death in 1922. Her home was a social center of local upper-class African-American social circles, including prominent civil rights activists such as William Monroe Trotter and Archibald Grimké.

The Baldwin House is a private home and is not open to the public. The northern half of the duplex was designated a National Historic Landmark and listed on the National Register of Historic Places in 1976.

== See also ==
- List of National Historic Landmarks in Massachusetts
- National Register of Historic Places listings in Cambridge, Massachusetts
