= Paul Cuffe Farm =

- U.S. National Register of Historic Places
- U.S. National Historic Landmark
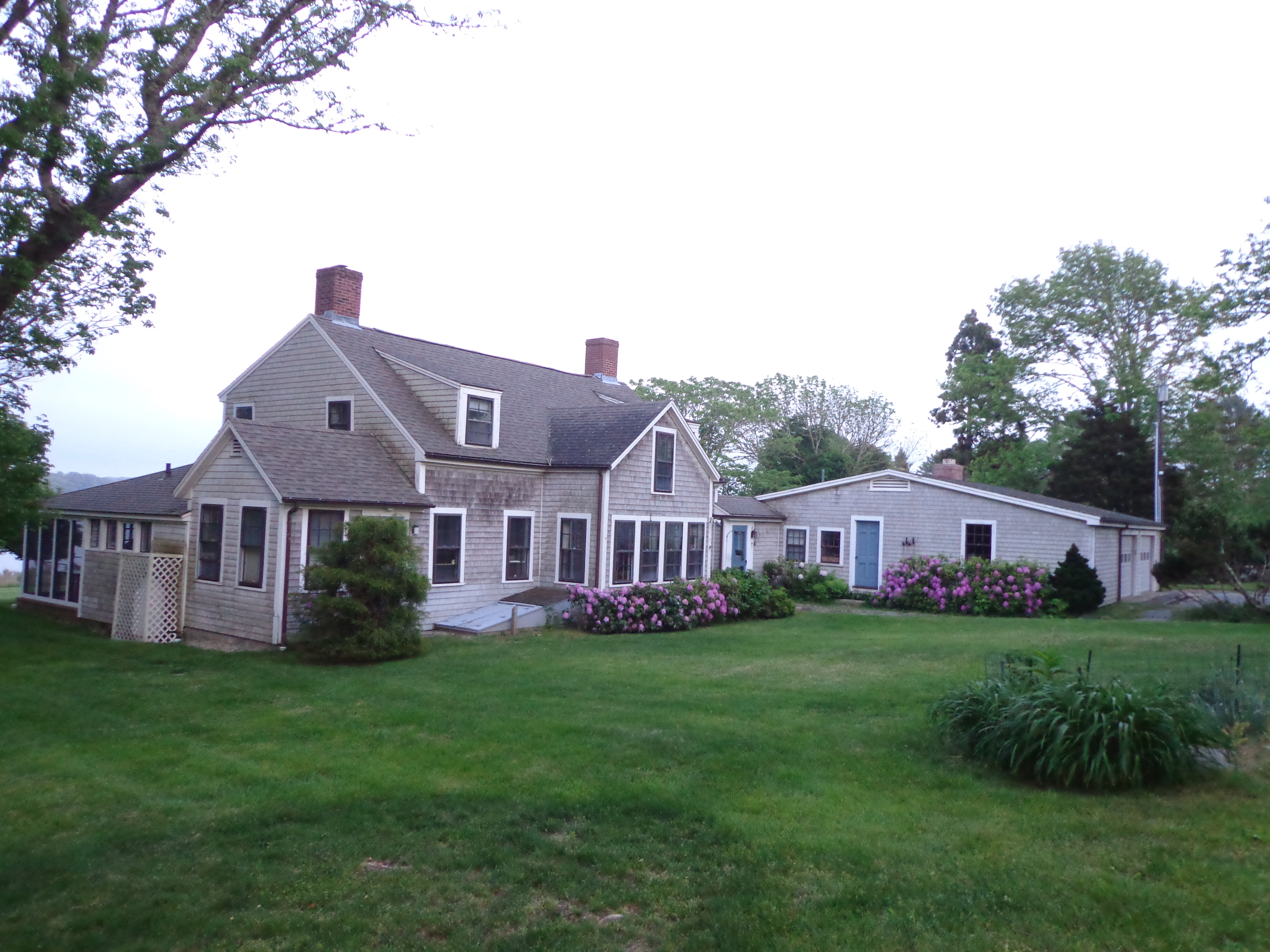
- View from the northeast

- Location within Massachusetts Location within the United States
- Location: Westport, Massachusetts
- Coordinates: 41°32′57″N 71°4′6″W
- Built: 1780
- NRHP reference No.: 74000394

Significant dates
- Added to NRHP: May 30, 1974
- Designated NHL: May 30, 1974

The Paul Cuffe Farm is a National Historic Landmark on 1504 Drift Road in Westport, Massachusetts. The house was traditionally and incorrectly believed to be owned by Paul Cuffe (1759–1815), a prominent farmer and merchant of African American and Native American ancestry. Cuffe was active in promoting the idea of returning African Americans to Africa, making a voyage to what is now Sierra Leone in 1811 to support a fledgling colony there. The farm was designated a National Historic Landmark in 1974.

== Description and history ==
The farmstead is located in rural southern Westport, on the western bank of the East Branch Westport River. It is reached from Drift Road by a long drive, and is set in a landscaped clearing overlooking the river. It is a 2 1/2-story wood-frame structure, resting on a granite foundation, with two interior brick chimneys rising from the gabled roof. Construction of the house is estimated to have been around 1780, based on architectural analysis of its chimneys. The property also has evidence of wooden-pile wharves of similar antiquity, and submerged granite blocks which suggest a stone pier may have once been located there.

Although the house was believed to belong to Paul Cuffe at the time of its National Historic Landmark designation in 1974, subsequent research by local historians has cast doubt on this attribution. Although Cuffe was known to own land in this area, and may have used the wharves on this property in his merchant business, the documented ownership history of this parcel does not include him. Between 1748 and 1884 the property was under the continuous ownership of members of the Tripp family. It is possible that Cuffe's son-in-law lived here briefly.

Paul Cuffe (1759–1815) was born to an African father and a Wampanoag mother on Cuttyhunk Island. From poor beginnings, he went to sea, rising to become a ship's captain and then owner. His work promoting efforts to resettle former slaves to Africa brought him an international reputation, including contact with high-profile Americans such as Albert Gallatin and James Madison. Cuffe was also active in the promotion of civil rights in his native Massachusetts, petitioning the state for tax relief because he was not allowed to vote.

== See also ==
- List of National Historic Landmarks in Massachusetts
- National Register of Historic Places listings in Bristol County, Massachusetts
