= League of Women for Community Service =

American Black women's organization

The League of Women for Community Service, founded in 1918, is a historic Black women's organization in Boston, Massachusetts.

== History ==
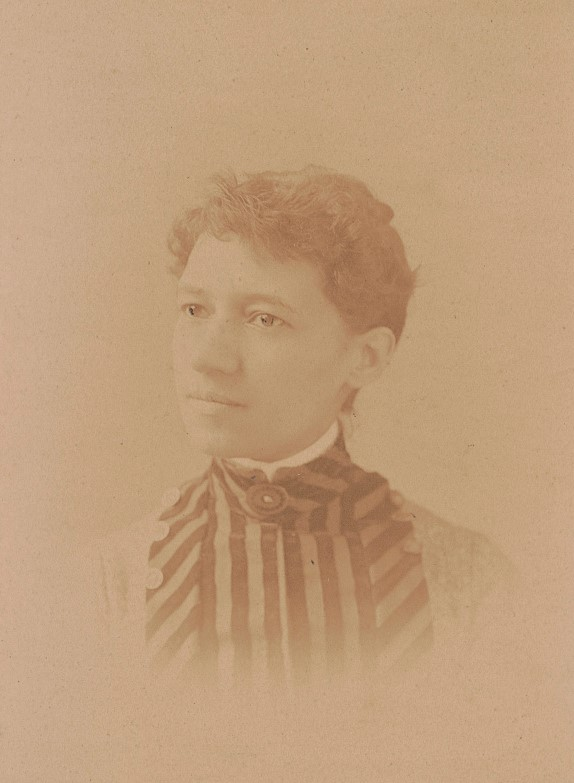
Maria Molly Baldwin about 1885

The League of Women for Community Service was founded in 1918 to provide support African American soldiers and sailors during World War I. Since Blacks were denied access to many forms of public accommodation, they formed the Soldiers Comfort Unit with committees assigned responsibility for "publicity, hospitality, entertainment, music, supplies, soldiers and sailors visiting, junior comfort unit, printing, knitting, and Red Cross".

The League's first president was Maria Baldwin, a pioneering African American educator who occupied the role until her death in 1922. Other notable members included Josephine St. Pierre Ruffin, Florida Ruffin Ridley, and Maud Cuney Hare.

League meetings were initially held in members' homes. In January 1920, the League acquired a townhouse to serve as its headquarters. The building, located on Chester Square at 558 Massachusetts Avenue, was built for abolitionists William and Martha Carnes in 1857/58. They made it a stop on the Underground Railroad. The home was sold to Nathaniel W. Farwell (Note: Farwell was a businessman with textile-related interests all over New England. He had been the mayor of Lewiston, Maine. The family's business interests included cotton mills that relied on enslaved and indentured labor on plantations in the American South.) in 1868 and the League purchased the home on January 30, 1920, from the Nathaniel Farwell's widow Eliza.

After World War I, the League expanded to provide social programs and services for Boston's Black community. During the 1930s, the city Welfare Department positioned a social worker in the League's offices. The League sponsored a school lunch program for students at the Dwight (now the Hurley School) on West Springfield Street across from the rear of the headquarters building. The Works Progress Administration (WPA) established Boston's first community reading and game room in the basement.

The League provided lodging for students excluded from nearby college dormitories due to segregation. Coretta Scott King roomed at the League's headquarters while attending Boston Conservatory in the early 1950s.

The League remains active. In 2021, the League received a grant from the National Trust for Historic Preservation's African American Cultural Heritage Action Fund to support the restoration of their building's entry portico. As part of its commitment to accessible higher education, the League awards Maria L. Baldwin Scholarships annually to college-bound female students of African American descent from the Roxbury and Dorchester neighborhoods of Boston.

In 2022, Boston's Archeological Program chose the yard space behind the League's headquarters for an archeological dig in the hopes of learning about the lives of the building's first owners, its role in the Underground Railroad, and the early history of the League.

== See also ==
- Military history of African Americans#World War I and Interwar Period
