= Margaret Fuller House =

Historic house in Massachusetts, United States

- U.S. National Register of Historic Places
- U.S. National Historic Landmark
- U.S. Historic district – Contributing property
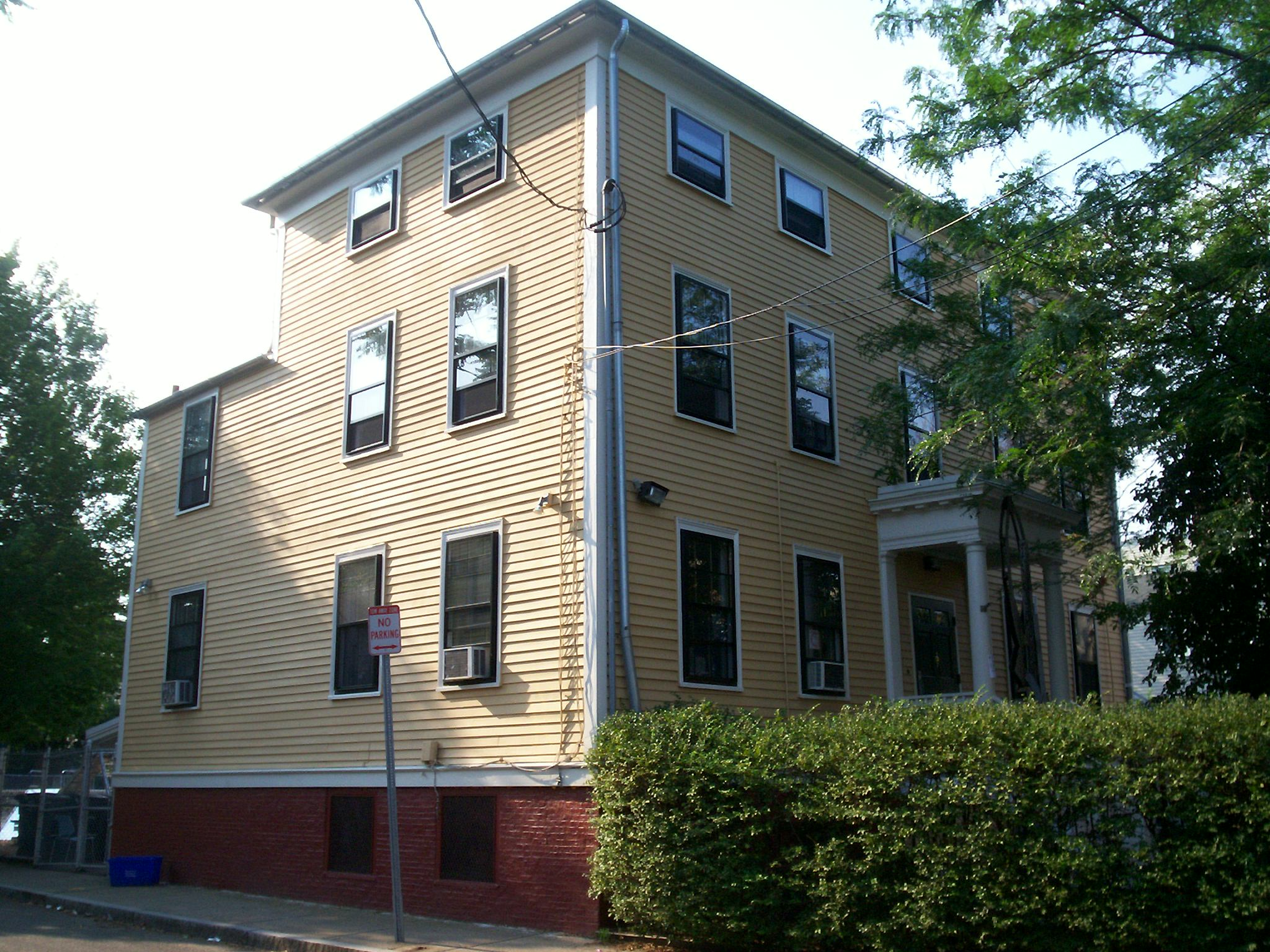
- Margaret Fuller House.

- Location within Massachusetts Location within the United States
- Location: Cambridge, Massachusetts
- Coordinates: 42°21′52.6″N 71°05′50.7″W
- Built: 1810
- Architectural style: Federal
- Part of: Old Cambridgeport Historic District (ID83000820)
- NRHP reference No.: 71000686

Significant dates
- Added to NRHP: July 2, 1971
- Designated NHL: May 30, 1974
- Designated CP: June 30, 1983

The Margaret Fuller House was the birthplace and childhood home of American transcendentalist Margaret Fuller (1810–1850). It is located at 71 Cherry Street, in the Old Cambridgeport Historic District area of Cambridge, Massachusetts, in the neighborhood now called "The Port" (formerly known as "Area Four") (north of Massachusetts Avenue, between Central and Kendall Squares). The house is now a National Historic Landmark.

The three-story, wooden, Federal style house was built in the early 19th century, and was Fuller's home from birth until age 16. In 1902 it became the Margaret Fuller House of Cambridge, a settlement house providing information and services to help immigrants assimilate into American culture. It is now known as the Margaret Fuller Neighborhood House.

== History ==
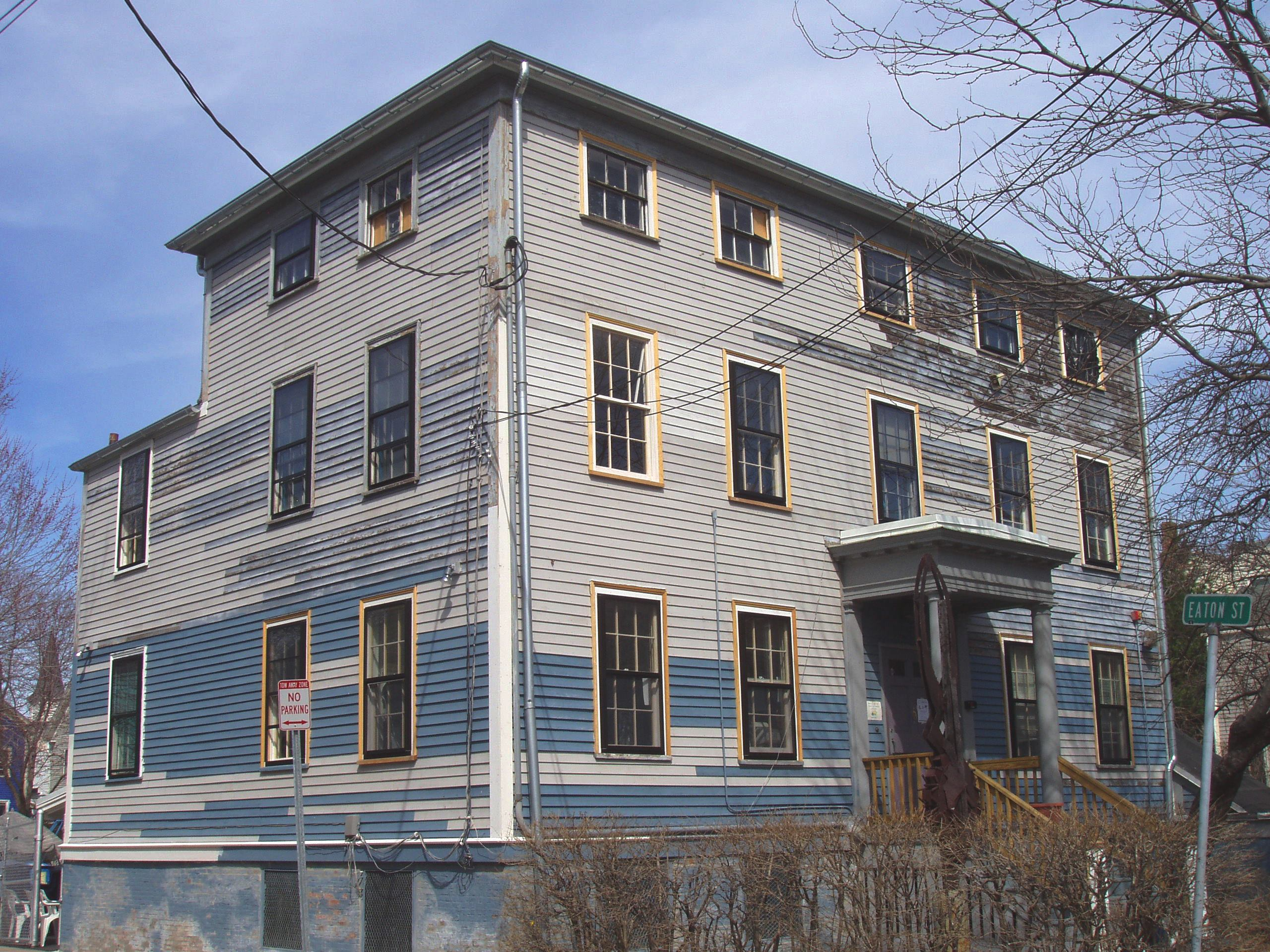
House prior to recent renovations

Fuller's parents, Timothy Fuller and Margaret Crane Fuller, were married in 1809. A few months after the wedding, they bought the three-story, Federal-style house on Cherry Street for the high price of $6,000. The couple's daughter Sarah Margaret Fuller was born in this home on May 23, 1810.

== Current use ==
Today, the Margaret Fuller House is being used to service the public in The Port community in Cambridge. It provides a free computer lab, computer classes, a food pantry, after-school services for children, meeting room space for various activities for the public and a daytime summer camp for children. A fundraiser is held every year for the MFNH called the Sweet Soul Supper to help provide money to run these services.

The house was designated a National Historic Landmark in 1974 for its association with Fuller, whose publication of Woman in the Nineteenth Century in the 1840s has been described by her biographer Karen Antony as "the first considered statement of feminism in this country".

== See also ==
- William Brattle House – Margaret Fuller also lived in this home in Cambridge later in her life
- List of National Historic Landmarks in Massachusetts
- National Register of Historic Places listings in Cambridge, Massachusetts
