= Fort Hill Rural Historic District =

Historic district in Massachusetts, United States

- U.S. National Register of Historic Places
- U.S. Historic district
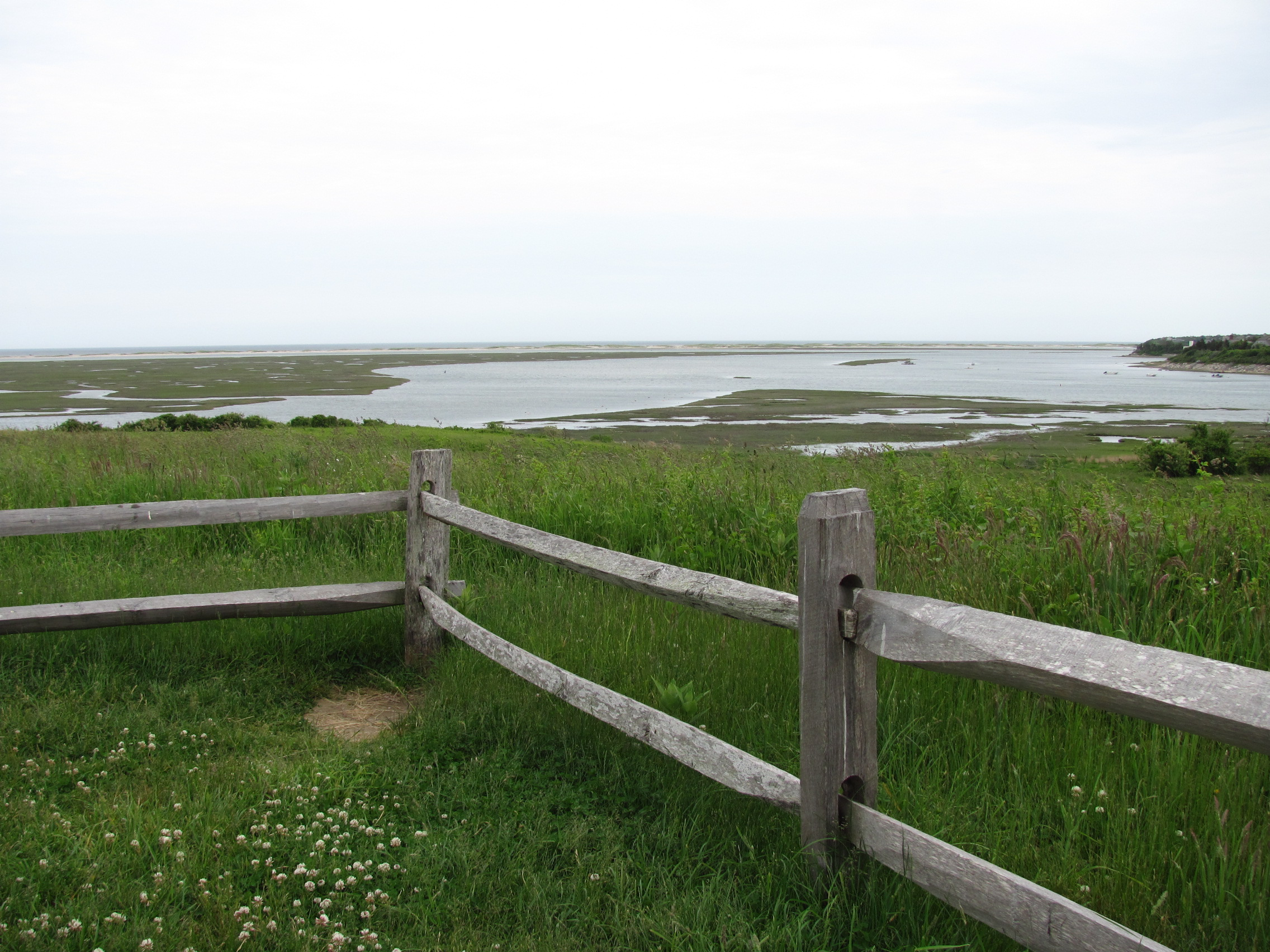
- View from Fort Hill

- Location within Cape Cod Location within Massachusetts Location within the United States
- Location: Eastham, Massachusetts
- Coordinates: 41°49′10″N 69°57′56″W
- Area: 100 acres (40 ha)
- Built: 1868
- Architectural style: Second Empire, Greek Revival
- NRHP reference No.: 00001656
- Added to NRHP: April 5, 2001

The Fort Hill Rural Historic District is a historic district encompassing two farmsteads with more than 200 years of history in Eastham, Massachusetts. The district is a 100-acre (40 ha) area of forest, fields, and salt marshes that was owned by the Knowles and Penninman families from 1742 to 1941. It has been part of the Cape Cod National Seashore since 1961. The area is dominated by the rise called "Fort Hill", which provides extensive views of the area and has its own rich history. The district includes the Edward Penniman House and Barn, previously listed on the National Register of Historic Places, and the Nauset Archeological District, a National Historic Landmark.

The district was listed on the National Register of Historic Places in 2001.

== See also ==
- National Register of Historic Places listings in Cape Cod National Seashore
- National Register of Historic Places listings in Barnstable County, Massachusetts
