= Nauset Archeological District =

Historic district in Massachusetts, United States

- U.S. National Register of Historic Places
- U.S. National Historic Landmark District
- U.S. Historic district – Contributing property
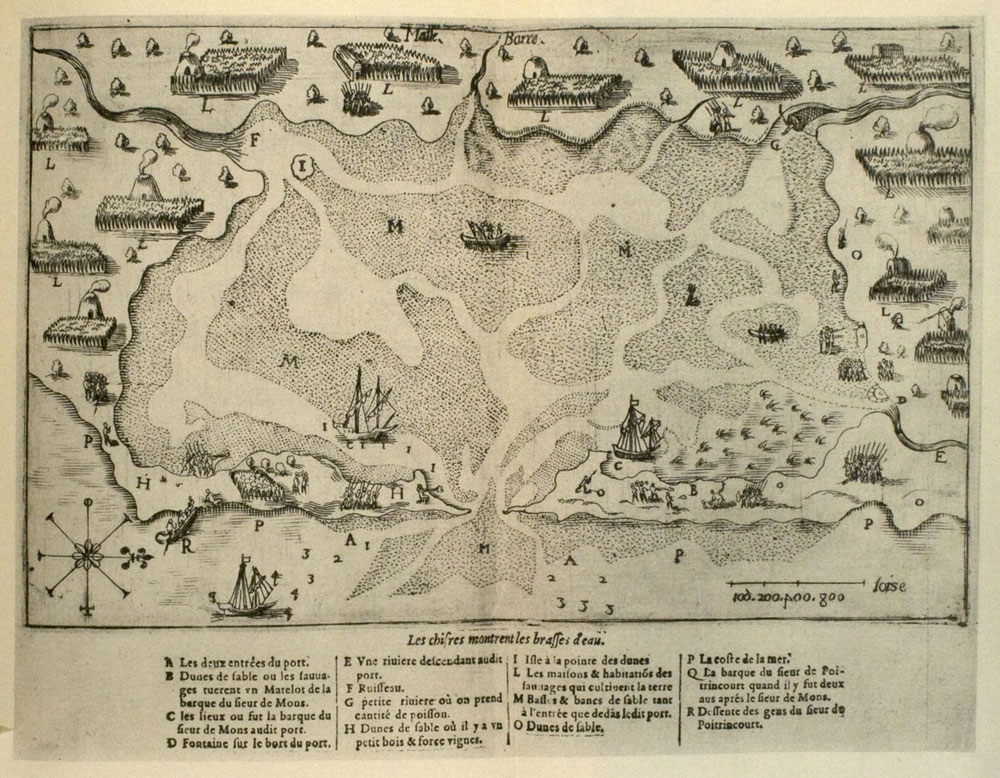
- A 1605 map showing Nauset Harbor lined with the wigwams of the Nauset tribe

- Location within Cape Cod Location within Massachusetts Location within the United States
- Location: Eastham, Massachusetts
- Coordinates: 41°49′8.04″N 69°57′46.44″W
- Built: 4,000 B.C.
- Part of: Fort Hill Rural Historic District (ID00001656)
- NRHP reference No.: 93000607

Significant dates
- Added to NRHP: April 19, 1993
- Designated NHLD: April 19, 1993
- Designated CP: April 5, 2001

The Nauset Archaeological District (or "Coast Guard Beach Site,19BN374" or "North Salt Pond Site,19BN390") is a National Historic Landmark District in Eastham, Massachusetts. Located within the southern portion of the Cape Cod National Seashore, this area was the location of substantial ancient settlements since at least 4,000 BC.

The first written account of this area was by Samuel de Champlain in 1605, in which he described sailing into a bay surrounded by the wigwams of the Nauset tribe (see map, right). The account detailed the settlement's crops (e.g. corn, beans, squash, tobacco), housing (round wigwams covered with thatched reeds), and clothing (woven from grasses, hemp, and animal skins). De Champlain's map also depicts one of their fishing methods, using a conical weir constructed of saplings and grass rope, designed to capture fish swimming from the marsh into a pond. To farm the land, they used stone hoes and fire-hardened wood tools. About 150 people were living at the site around Nauset Harbor, and about 500-600 were living around Stage Harbor to the south in the area of present-day Chatham. Archaeological studies have since shown that these settlements were occupied year-round.

After 1620, English colonists from the settlement at Plymouth visited Nauset many times to buy food and trade. In addition to goods for trade, however, the Europeans also unwittingly introduced diseases. Many of them died as a result, and their population declined drastically. In 1639 about half of the English from Plymouth relocated to the Nauset area, settling the town that is now Eastham.

The district was added to the National Register of Historic Places in 1993. The area can be visited via the Fort Hill area of the Cape Cod National Seashore, off U. S. Route 6, where the Fort Hill and Red Maple Swamp trails wind from the top of the hill to the marsh and beyond.

== See also ==
- List of National Historic Landmarks in Massachusetts
- National Register of Historic Places listings in Cape Cod National Seashore
- National Register of Historic Places listings in Barnstable County, Massachusetts
