= John B. Gough House =

Historic house in Massachusetts, United States

- U.S. National Register of Historic Places
- U.S. National Historic Landmark
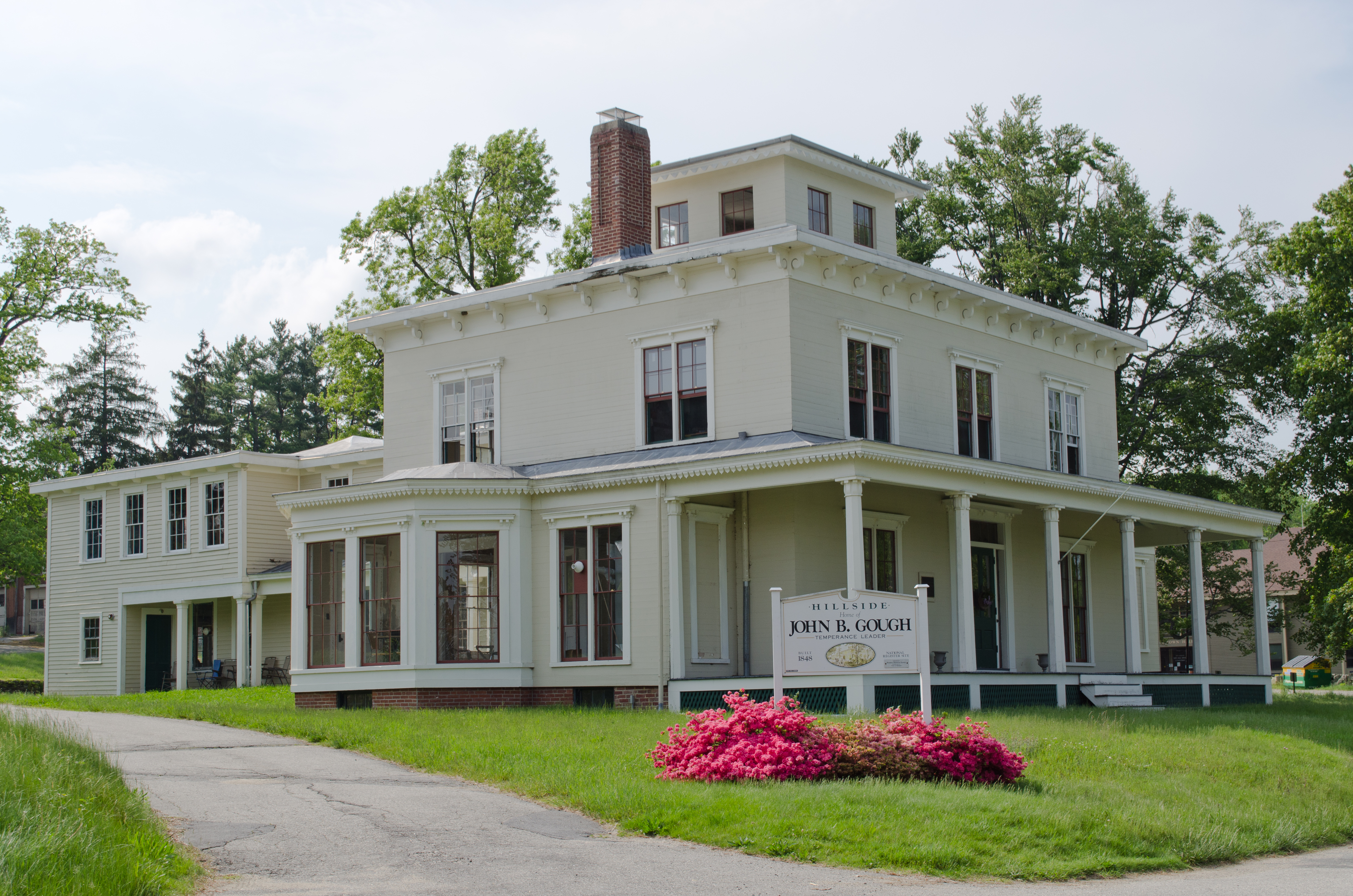

- Location within Massachusetts Location within the United States
- Location: Boylston, Massachusetts
- Coordinates: 42°19′42″N 71°45′22″W
- Built: 1848
- Architectural style: Italianate
- NRHP reference No.: 74001763

Significant dates
- Added to NRHP: March 19, 1974
- Designated NHL: May 30, 1974

The John B. Gough House, also known as Hillside, is a National Historic Landmark at 215 Main Street in Boylston, Massachusetts. It is significant as the home of temperance orator John B. Gough, and as an excellent example of Italianate architecture. Gough was born in England and came to the United States as a child. After the death of his mother in 1835, his life descended into alcoholism, until he took a temperance pledge in 1842. In 1846 he married Mary Whitcombe, a Boylston native, and in 1848 built this two story farmhouse, which is where he lived until his death in 1886.

The house is roughly square in plan, with three bays on each side, and is topped by a flat roof with a square belvedere on top. It has wide overhanging eaves studded with brackets, and a wide porch spans the width of the front. Additions have been added onto the rear of the house.

George F Fuller, president of the Wyman-Gordon Co. purchased the John B Gough Farm in March 1930. He also purchased the Bancroft Farm and the Anderson Farm as well. This was part of the New England Power Construction Company purchase. Worcester Daily Telegram March 1930.

After Gough's death, the house was purchased by William J. Hogg, owner of the Worcester-based Crompton Carpet Company. For much of the 20th century the estate served as the campus of the Shepherd Knapp School, and in the 1980s the property was acquired by Digital Equipment Corporation and used as a training facility. It is now in under the control of the Boylston Historical Society, which is working to restore the property.

The house was declared a National Historic Landmark and listed on the National Register of Historic Places in 1974.

A photo of the house appears on page 491 of the 1899 book The Worcester of eighteen hundred and ninety-eight. Fifty years a city. A graphic presentation of its institutions, industries and leaders.

Hillside in the 1890s after it was sold to William Hogg. Photo shows Mrs. May Hogg and Mrs. William C. Marble

1890s view from the John B. Gough house in West Boylston, Mass. Photo shows members of the Hogg family, who bought the house after Gough's death.

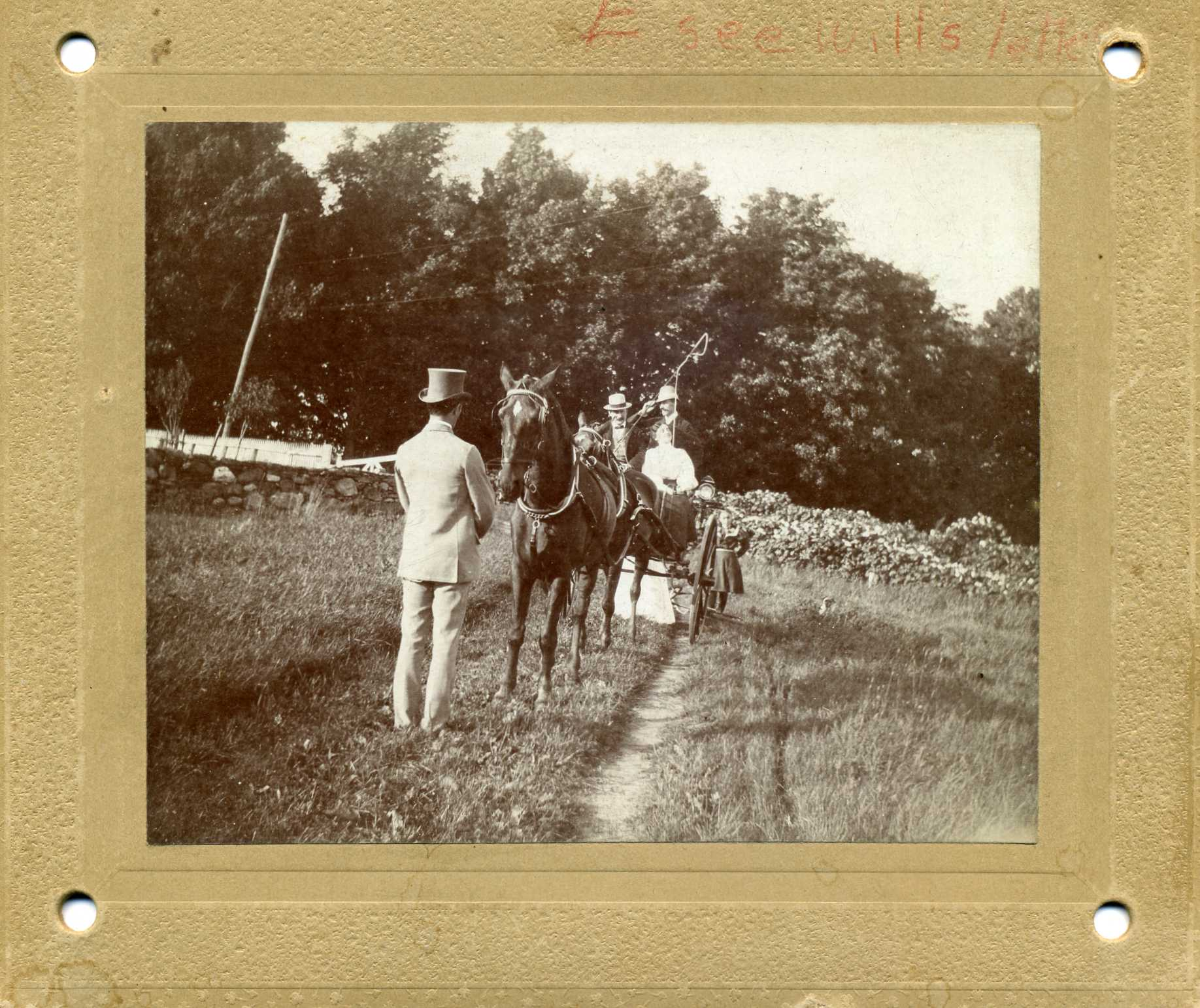
Hillside view

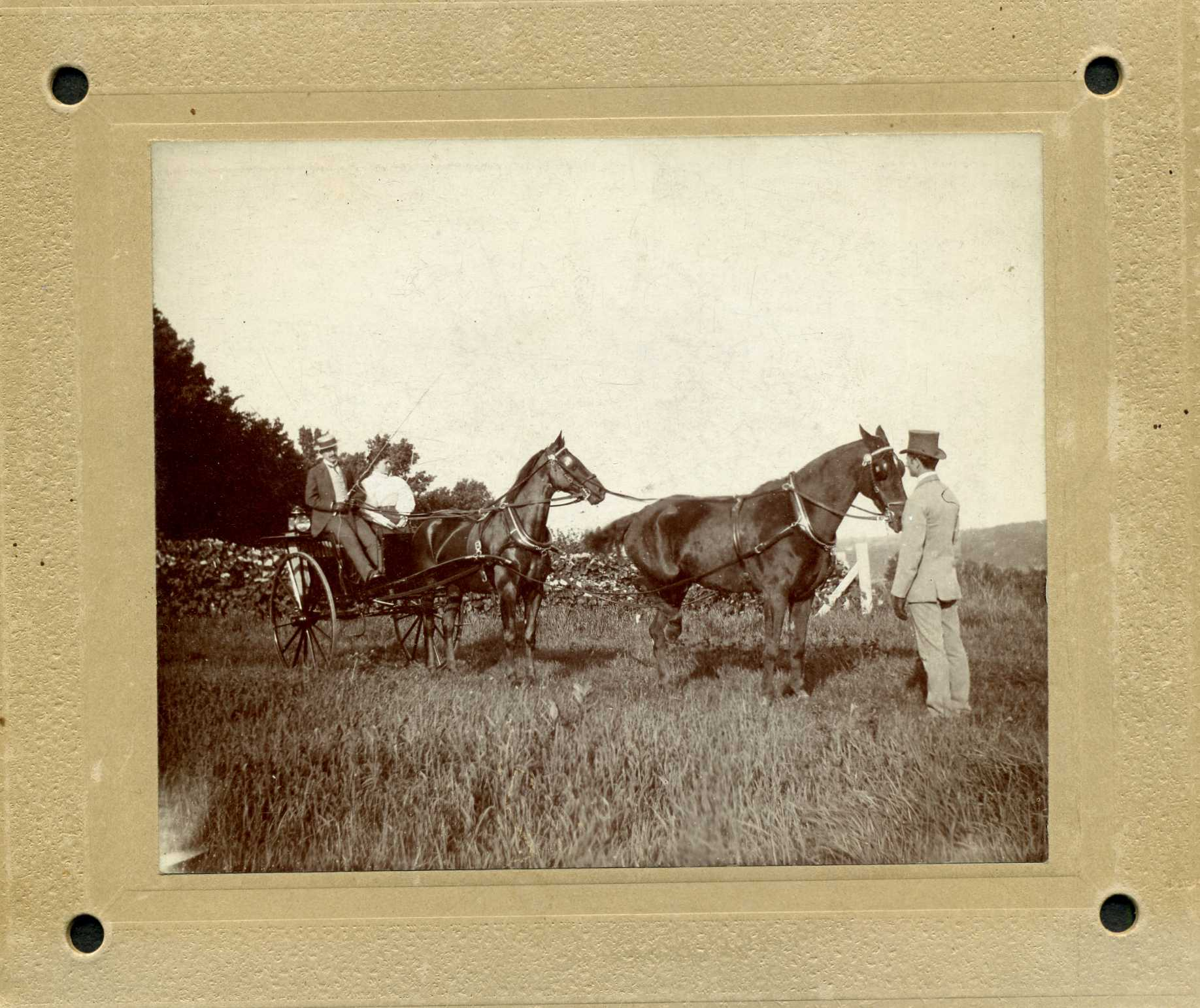
Another Hillside view

== See also ==
- List of National Historic Landmarks in Massachusetts
- National Register of Historic Places listings in Worcester County, Massachusetts
