= Oliver Wendell Holmes House =

Historic house in Massachusetts, United States

- Oliver Wendell Holmes House in Beverly
- U.S. National Register of Historic Places
- U.S. National Historic Landmark
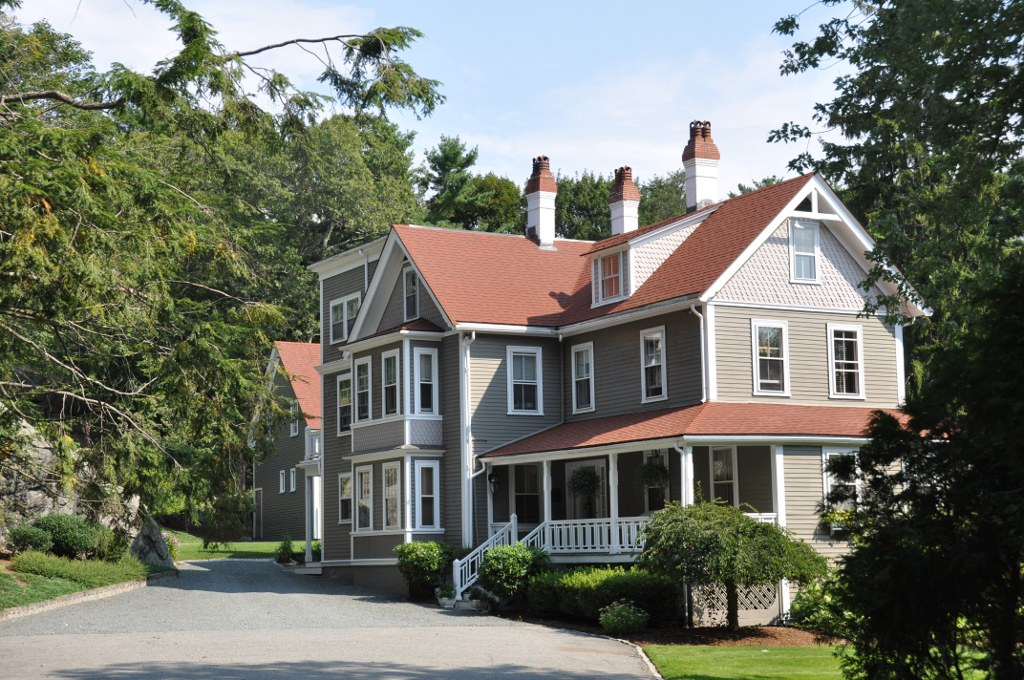
- Oliver Wendell Holmes Jr. House in 2012

- Location within Massachusetts Location within the United States
- Location: Beverly, Massachusetts
- Coordinates: 42°33′52″N 70°48′23″W
- Built: c. 1880
- Architect: Marshall, Asa Obear
- Architectural style: Late Victorian
- NRHP reference No.: 72001301

Significant dates
- Added to NRHP: November 28, 1972
- Designated NHL: November 28, 1972

The Oliver Wendell Holmes House is a historic house at 868 Hale Street in the Beverly Farms section of Beverly, Massachusetts. Built c. 1880, this modest Victorian wood-frame house was designated a National Historic Landmark in 1972, as the only surviving structure associated with the life of Associate Justice of the United States Supreme Court Oliver Wendell Holmes Jr. (1841–1935), whose summer home it was from 1909 until his death.

== Description and history ==
The Holmes House is a 2 1/2-story wood-frame structure, with a steeply pitched gable roof, and three brick chimneys. Its exterior is sheathed in wooden clapboards, with shingles in the front-facing gable end and on the sides of a shed-roof dormer. The house is roughly T-shaped, with a porch that originally wrapped around two sides, but has since been partly enclosed. The rear of the house is a full-height service ell, and a carriage house stands behind the main house. A gravel drive leads from the street, around the north side of the house, to the carriage house.

The house was built between 1875 and 1880 by Asa Obear Marshall, and was sold by his widow to Justice Oliver Wendell Holmes Jr. in 1909. The Holmeses divided their time between this house and a residence in Washington, D.C., generally staying here between June and October. While here, Holmes would continue to work on cases, and would entertain judges and politicians, including Louis Brandeis, Henry Cabot Lodge, and Albert Beveridge. It was here that he was introduced to Harold Laski, a British politician and economist with whom he maintained a long correspondence.

After Holmes' death in 1935, the house was sold and its contents dispersed. It remains in private hands.

== See also ==
- National Register of Historic Places listings in Essex County, Massachusetts
- List of National Historic Landmarks in Massachusetts
