= Chester Square (Boston) =

Coordinates: 42°20′17.78″N 71°4′45″W

Chester Square is a residential garden square located along Massachusetts Avenue in Boston, between Tremont Street and Shawmut Avenue. The name "Chester" is derived from the original name of the street, which was renamed Massachusetts Avenue on March 1, 1894. Chester Park is also located in the historic South End of Boston.

== History ==
1888 map laying out Chester Square

The square was first constructed in the mid-19th century to attract affluent residents. The park was once the largest garden square in the South End. It originally included a very large white, three tiered fountain with a seating area and numerous trees, flowers, and other gardens. It fell into decline shortly after the start of the 20th century for a number of reasons. As a result, wealthy residents moved to neighborhoods like Back Bay which were highly regarded, and many of the South End's rowhouses were subdivided into rentals which attracted less affluent residents. The grand Victorian townhouses were gradually divided up and converted into smaller units, public buildings, and rooming houses. The park suffered its most devastating change in the 1950s when City and State officials decided to run Massachusetts Avenue directly through the park, dividing the square in half.

=== Present day ===
Chester Square has since seen a significant turnaround since the late 1990s, as part of the overall economic and real estate boom that has been impacting the South End of Boston. While there are no current plans to rejoin the two garden squares to make them whole again, upcoming plans include a complete makeover of the park complete with two new fountains, as part of the State's plans to redesign Massachusetts Avenue from Symphony Hall to Albany Street and the I-93 Connector. Construction has started as of June 2008 on the two adjacent parks.

== Changing street names ==
Excerpt from "Mass Ave History":

Chester Park, Boston 1858, from Washington Street to Albany Street; from South Bay to Boston Water Power Company's land named Chester Oar, June 22, 1858; part east of Harrison Avenue named East Chester Park, November 16, 1858; from Shawmut Avenue to Tremont Street named Chester Square, December 29, 1858; called West Chester Park and so accepted, December 21, 1859; from Washington Street to Shawmut Avenue named Chester Square, March 3, 1864; from Washington Street to Albany Street named East Chester Park, April 27, 1869; East Chester Park named East Chester Avenue July 13, 1869 and East Chester Avenue named Chester Park, April 5, 1870; name of East Chester Park, Chester Park, Chester Square, and West Chester Park Changed to Massachusetts Avenue, March 1, 1894.

== See also ==
- League of Women for Community Service
