= Redtop (Belmont, Massachusetts) =

Historic house in Massachusetts, United States

- Red Top
- U.S. National Register of Historic Places
- U.S. National Historic Landmark
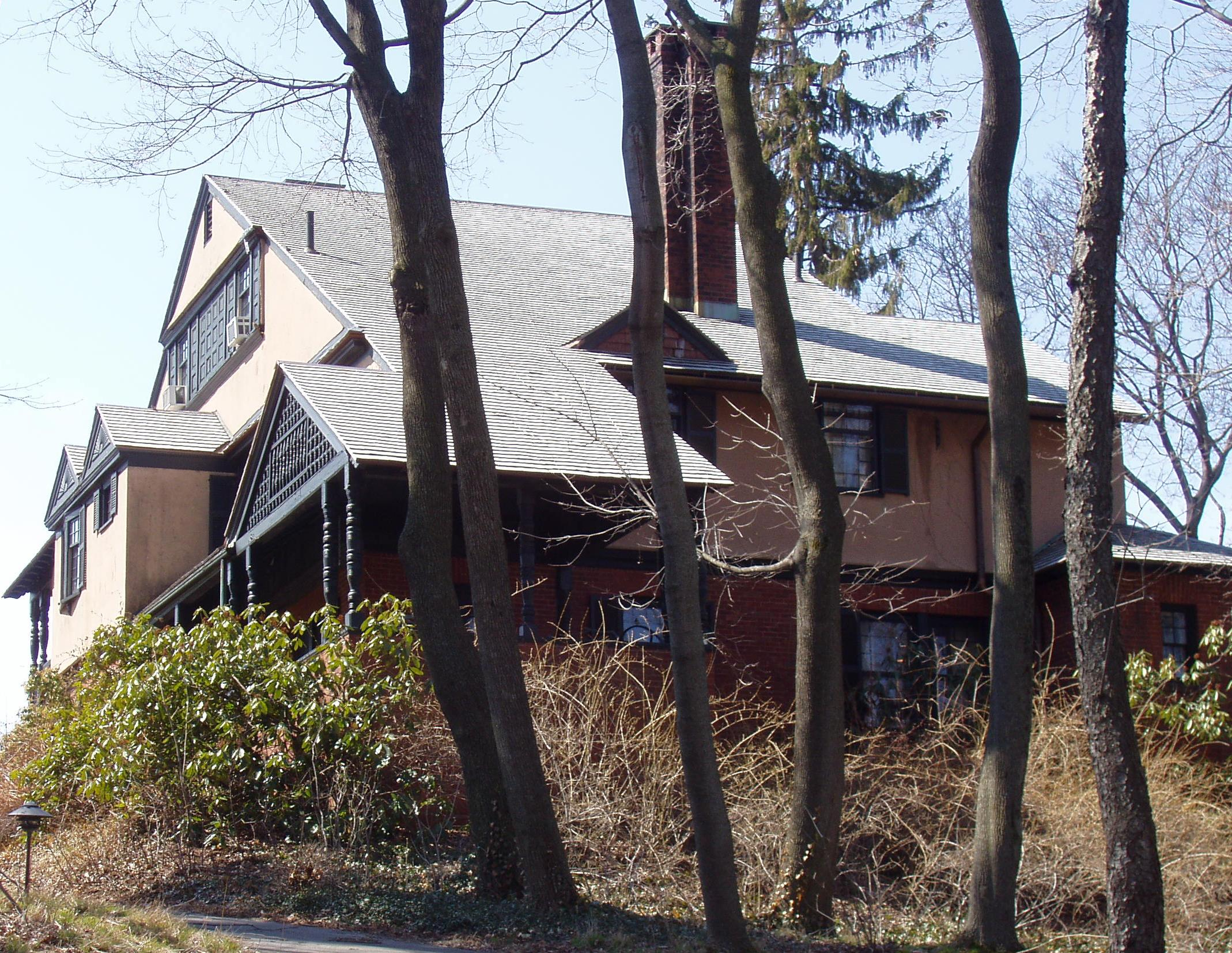
- Redtop in Belmont, Massachusetts

- Location within Massachusetts Location within the United States
- Location: Belmont, Massachusetts
- Coordinates: 42°24′1″N 71°10′46″W
- Built: 1878
- Architect: William Rutherford Mead of McKim, Mead & Bigelow
- Architectural style: Shingle Style
- NRHP reference No.: 71000911

Significant dates
- Added to NRHP: November 11, 1971
- Designated NHL: November 11, 1971

Redtop (also written as Red Top) is a historic shingle style house located at 90 Somerset Street, Belmont, Massachusetts. It was designated a National Historic Landmark in 1971 for its association with writer and literary critic William Dean Howells (1837–1920), a leading proponent of realism in literature. The Shingle Style house was designed by Howells' brother-in-law William Rutherford Mead of the architecture firm McKim, Mead & Bigelow, and it was the Howells' residence from its construction in 1877 to 1882.

== History ==
The summer house was designed by William Rutherford Mead, brother of Mrs. (Elinor Mead) Howells, and a partner in the architectural firm of McKim, Mead & Bigelow. The following year Stanford White joined the firm, and it was renamed McKim, Mead & White. The house was originally roofed with red-stained wood shingles, hence the name "Redtop". The family discarded other naming ideas including "Sub-Hub", "Monte Rose", "The Parlor Car", and "The Spindles". The owner of the new house was, in fact, Charles Fairchild (1838–1910), a Boston financier, who rented it to the Howellses. However, it was designed from the start for the Howellses' taste, with Mead's partner, Charles Follen McKim becoming more and more involved. Construction began in 1877, and the Howellses moved in on July 8, 1878. By 1885, the Howellses had moved to Beacon Hill in Boston, in part due to family illness, including that of Elinor Howells.

Howells experienced great literary success during his time at Redtop. By the end of the 1880s, he had published nine novels, a novella, several magazine articles, and a few plays. At Redtop, he worked in an elegant white-paneled study with a carved inglenook for naps. Here, he completed The Lady of The Aroostook (1879) and The Undiscovered Country (1880) and began writing A Woman's Reason (1883). He began The Rise of Silas Lapham in England, and completed it in 1885 while living at 302 Beacon Street in Boston.

Several other American authors visited Redtop during the period when the Howells family lived there. To judge from published letters, Mark Twain visited Redtop eight times. Other visitors included Thomas Bailey Aldrich, Henry Wadsworth Longfellow, Henry James, and Charles Dudley Warner.

== Location and design ==
The house sits on a large lot high atop Belmont Hill, looking out over Cambridge and Boston. It is built of brick and was originally clad in wood shingles in the Queen Anne style, with a large, sloping roof dominating the house as seen from the road beneath. The red roof that gave the house its nickname is now covered in gray shingles. The exterior walls were later stripped of their wood shingles and covered with stucco.

Novelist Henry James described the house as a "fairy abode of light and beauty" on its "cheerful, breezy hill . . . I never saw a house that took my fancy more captive at once by its tone of colour—as soon as I had entered the door; and every subsequent impression deepened the effect. All the details struck me as purely lovely, and when I looked from within outwards and over that incomparable landscape . . . I said to myself, 'Well, good fortune can no further go. Let silence muse the amount of it!' "

Mead's architectural designs for Redtop are preserved in the Amherst College Archives.

== See also ==
- William Dean Howells House (Cambridge, Massachusetts)
- List of National Historic Landmarks in Massachusetts
- National Register of Historic Places listings in Middlesex County, Massachusetts
