= Maria Louise Baldwin =

Pioneering female African American educator

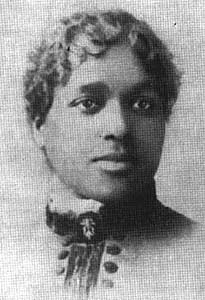
- Born: September 13, 1856; Cambridge, Massachusetts, U.S.
- Died: January 9, 1922 (aged 65); Boston, Massachusetts, U.S.
- Monuments: Maria Baldwin House, Maria L. Baldwin School, part of Boston Women's Heritage Trail
- Occupations: Educator, civic leader

Maria Louise Baldwin (September 13, 1856 – January 9, 1922) was an American educator and civic leader born and raised in Cambridge, Massachusetts. She lived almost all of her life in Cambridge and Boston. Writing in 1917, W. E. B. Du Bois claimed she had achieved the greatest distinction in education to that time of any African-American not working in segregated schools.

== Biography ==
Baldwin was born to Peter L. and Mary E. Baldwin in Cambridge, Massachusetts. She received all of her education in the city's public schools. In 1874, Baldwin graduated from Cambridge High School and a year later from the Cambridge training school for teachers. Despite her obvious talents as a teacher, she was not hired by the Cambridge Public Schools but instead first taught in a segregated school in Chestertown, Maryland for two years. After her father's death in 1880, she returned to Cambridge. Protests from the Cambridge African American community then led to her being hired to teach at the Agassiz school, a well regarded public school attended by middle class white children. In 1889 Baldwin was appointed principal, the first African-American female principal in Massachusetts and the Northeast. As principal, Baldwin supervised white faculty and a predominantly white student body. In 1916 when a new Agassiz school was erected, Baldwin was made master. She was one of only two women in the Cambridge school system who held the position of master and the only African American in New England to hold such a position.

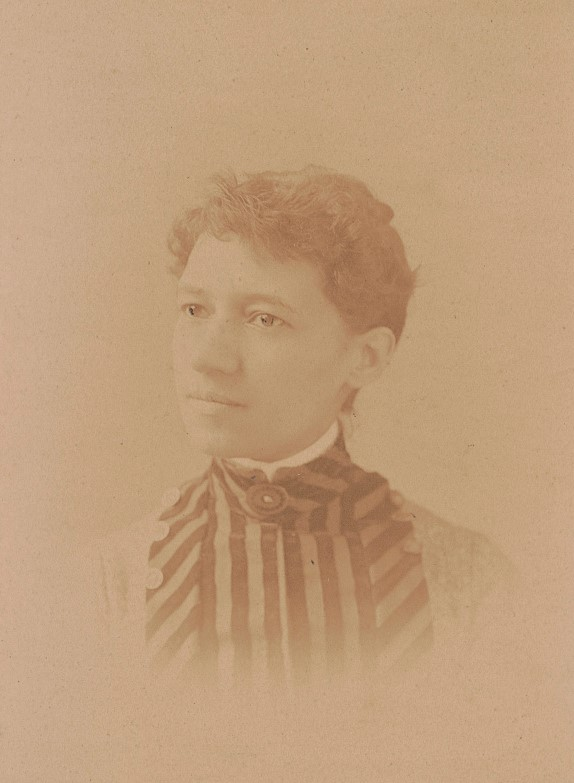
Maria Molly Baldwin ca. 1885

Baldwin served as principal and master of Agassiz school for forty years. Under her leadership, it became one of the best schools in the city, attended by children of Harvard professors and many of the old Cambridge families, becoming popular and respected among the larger Cambridge community. She introduced new methods of teaching mathematics and began art classes. She was the first to introduce the practice of hiring a school nurse. Her school was the only one in the city of Cambridge to establish an "open-air" classroom. Poet E. E. Cummings was one of her students and described her thus in his book Six Nonlectures:

Miss Baldwin, the dark lady mentioned in my first nonlecture (and a lady if ever a lady existed) was blessed with a delicious voice, charming manners, and a deep understanding of children. Never did any demidivine dictator more gracefully and easily rule a more unruly and less graceful populace. Her very presence emanated an honour and a glory: the honour of spiritual freedom—not mere freedom from—and the glory of being, not (like most extant mortals) really undead but actually alive. From her I marvellingly learned that the truest power is gentleness.

She lectured widely to both Euro-American and African American organizations. Her best-known presentation was her lecture on Harriet Beecher Stowe, which she first delivered as the Annual Washington's Birthday celebration at the Brooklyn Institute of Arts and Sciences in 1897. She was the first African American and the first woman to be invited to present this annual lecture. She also taught summer courses for teachers at the Hampton Institute in Virginia and the Institute for Colored Youth in Cheyney, Pennsylvania and was a supporter of Charlotte Hawkins Brown's Palmer Institute in Sedalia, North Carolina.

In the late 1870s, Baldwin joined several Civil Rights groups, becoming a member and secretary of the debate club the Banneker Society, using her position and skills to advocate for women's suffrage and the importance of childhood education. Her home was the central meeting place for the African American community. Beginning in the early 1890s she led a literary group for black Harvard students, among them William Monroe Trotter, William Lewis, and W.E.B. DuBois. She also organized and led the Omar Khayyam Circle, a black literary and intellectual group. Notable members included Clement G. Morgan, William Monroe Trotter, and others who became active in working for civil rights.

She belonged to numerous civic and educational organizations, both black and white. Among the white-dominated organizations were the Twentieth Century Club, the Cantabrigia Club, and the Boston Ethical Society. She was also a leader of the black community. In 1893, along with her close friends Josephine St. Pierre Ruffin and Flora Ruffin Ridley she founded the Woman's Era Club, one of the first African American women's clubs. The club published The Woman's Era the first periodical published by black women. She was a member of the board of directors and in 1903 was elected President of the Boston Literary and Historical Association, an organization of leading black activists who supported black civil rights.

She was one of the first women members of the Niagara Movement and a member of the Committee of Forty which organized the founding of the NAACP. The Woman's Era Club subsequently entered under the umbrella organization of the National Association of Colored Women's Clubs (NACWC). Baldwin was an advocate of woman suffrage. She was also an early member of the board of the Boston Branch of the NAACP. She was active in supporting the Robert Gould Shaw House, a settlement house in South Boston. During the First World War, she was central in founding the Soldiers Comfort Unit, which supported black soldiers stationed at Fort Devens. After the war, the group changed its name to the League of Women for Community Service. She served as President of the League until her death in 1922. While addressing the council of the Robert Gould Shaw House Association at the Copley Plaza Hotel in Boston, on January 9, 1922, she collapsed and died suddenly of heart attack at age 66.

== Legacy and honors ==
- Her home from 1892 on has been preserved as the Maria Baldwin House and was designated as a National Historic Landmark. It is privately owned and not open to the public.
- On February 12, 2004, Agassiz School was officially renamed as the Maria L. Baldwin School. The campaign was initiated by an eighth-grade student at the school and actively supported by other students and the principal.
- Baldwin is noted on the Boston Women's Heritage Trail for her connection with the League of Women for Community Service.
- The Agassiz neighborhood in Cambridge, Massachusetts was renamed as Baldwin in 2020

== Personal life ==
According to biographer Kathleen Weiler, Baldwin remained single: "As is true of many other aspects of Maria Baldwin's personal life, the reasons she remained single are not known. Her sister Alice also never married" and lived in all-female households with other black women teachers, and her black women associates included Alice Dunbar Nelson, who literary historian Gloria T. Hull concludes had significant lesbian intimacies. Weiler speculates: "Perhaps Maria and Alice Baldwin valued their professional lives over marriage, or they may merely have preferred to remain single. That we have no evidence of Maria's romantic relationships with either men or women does not mean they had no relationships. It means that this part of their history, like so much of the inner life of black women of this generation, is simply unknown."

== See also ==
- Maria Baldwin House
