= William Dean Howells House (Kittery Point, Maine) =

Historic house in Maine, United States

- U.S. National Register of Historic Places
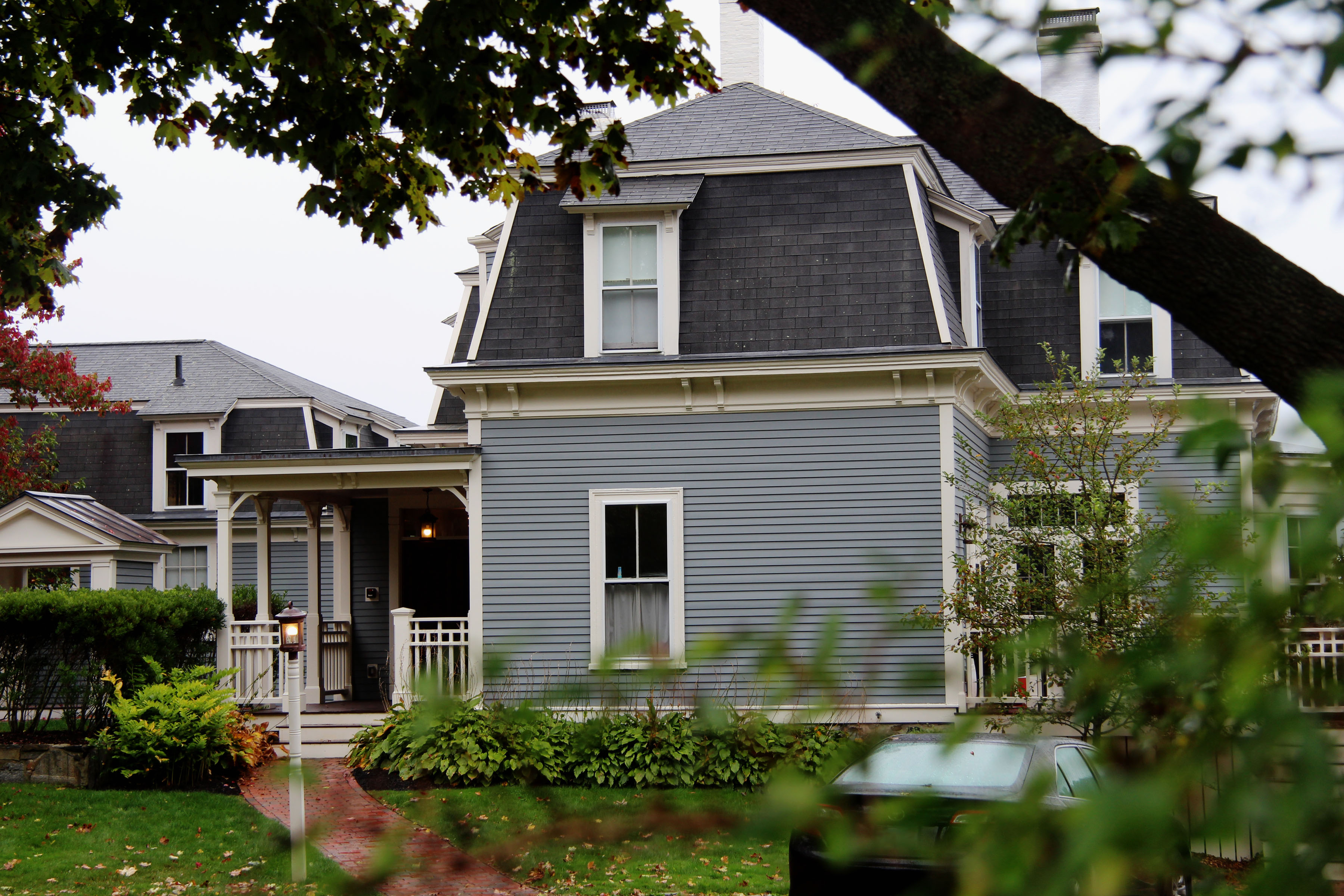

- Location within Maine Location within the United States
- Location: 36 Pepperrell Rd., Kittery Point, Maine
- Coordinates: 43°4′51″N 70°42′45″W
- Area: 1 acre (0.40 ha)
- Built: 1870
- Architectural style: Second Empire
- NRHP reference No.: 79000270
- Added to NRHP: October 25, 1979

The William Dean Howells House is a historic house at 36 Pepperrell Road in Kittery Point, Maine. Built c. 1870, this house was for many years the summer residence of writer and editor William Dean Howells, best known as editor of Atlantic Monthly magazine. The house was listed on the National Register of Historic Places in 1979 (where the listing misspells the name "Howels").

== Description and history ==
The Howells House is located on the south side of Pepperrell Road (Maine State Route 103), occupying a parcel of land that stretches down to the banks of the Piscataqua River, between the village of Kittery Point and Fort McClary State Park. It is a 1½-story wood-frame structure, with a mansard roof, clapboard siding, and a fieldstone foundation.

The main facade faces south toward the river and is three bays wide, with projecting bays on either side of a picture window. The right bay houses an entrance, while the left bay has a three-part window with a larger central arched portion. The mansard roof is pierced by shed-roof dormers. The main house is joined to a former carriage barn via an enclosed passage; the barn has been styled similarly.

The house was built about 1870 by Joseph D. Branum, a businessman from Springfield, Massachusetts. The house was for about 20 years the summer residence of the noted literary figure William Dean Howells (1837-1920). Howells achieved critical acclaim as editor of the Atlantic Monthly in the 1870s, and was also a writer of note. He was in his later years a major contributor to Century Magazine, and served as an advisor to Harper and Brothers.

== See also ==
- National Register of Historic Places listings in York County, Maine
