= William Dean Howells House (Cambridge, Massachusetts) =

Historic house in Massachusetts, United States

- U.S. National Register of Historic Places
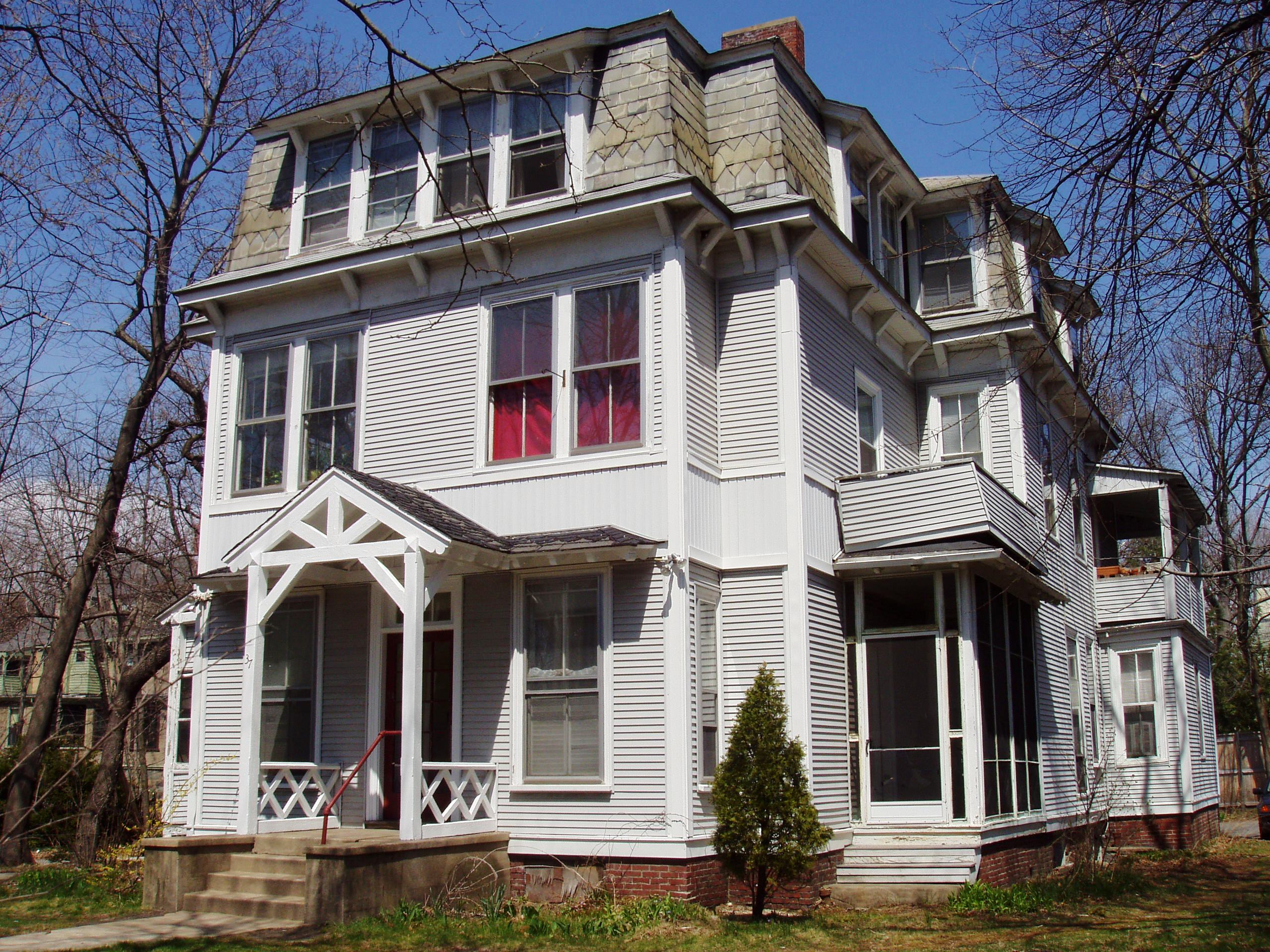
- William Dean Howells House

- Location within Massachusetts Location within the United States
- Location: 37 Concord Avenue, Cambridge, Massachusetts
- Coordinates: 42°22′48.9″N 71°7′36.0″W
- Built: 1873
- Architect: Mrs. William Dean Howells, R.C. Groverstein
- Architectural style: Second Empire
- MPS: Cambridge MRA
- NRHP reference No.: 82001949
- Added to NRHP: April 13, 1982

The William Dean Howells House is a house built and occupied by American author William Dean Howells and family. It is located at 37 Concord Avenue, Cambridge, Massachusetts. The house was designed by Howell's wife, Elinor Mead, and occupied by the family from 1873 to 1878. Authors including Mark Twain, Henry James, Henry Wadsworth Longfellow, and Thomas Bailey Aldrich visited the Howells in this house, as did U.S. President James Garfield, and Helen Keller lived there afterwards while attending school.

== History ==
As early as August 1872, William Dean Howells wrote to his brother-in-law that he had purchased land on Concord Avenue in Cambridge, Massachusetts for 33 cents per square foot. The family moved into their new home there on July 7, 1873. Howells and his wife agreed it was "the prettiest house in Cambridge" and intended to live there for the rest of their lives.

The Howells family left the home in 1878, after which they moved to Redtop in Belmont, Massachusetts. By 1900, they had purchased a home near Gloucester, Massachusetts.

After Elinor Mead Howells died in May 1910, Howells considered moving back to the Concord Avenue home with his daughter Mildred. Without Mrs. Howells, however, they found it "dreadful in its ghostliness and ghastliness" and, further, that the area had become noisy since the addition of two trolley lines nearby.

Before moving to the Concord Avenue house, the Howells family had lived in other Cambridge homes. From 1866 to 1870, they lived in a house (built in 1857) a few blocks north of Harvard University, at 41 Sacramento Street and from 1870 to 1872 they lived at 3 Berkeley Street. The Sacramento Street house is not on the National Register of Historic Places, but does have a Cambridge municipal landmark designation.

In recent times, this house fell into very serious disrepair, but was in 2011 restored by a local historic-restoration-specialist builder, after consultations with the City of Cambridge Historical Commission.

== See also ==
- National Register of Historic Places listings in Cambridge, Massachusetts
- Redtop (Belmont, Massachusetts), another Howell residence, and a National Historic Landmark
