= Laurence Gronlund =

Danish-American lawyer, writer, lecturer, and political activist (1844–1899)

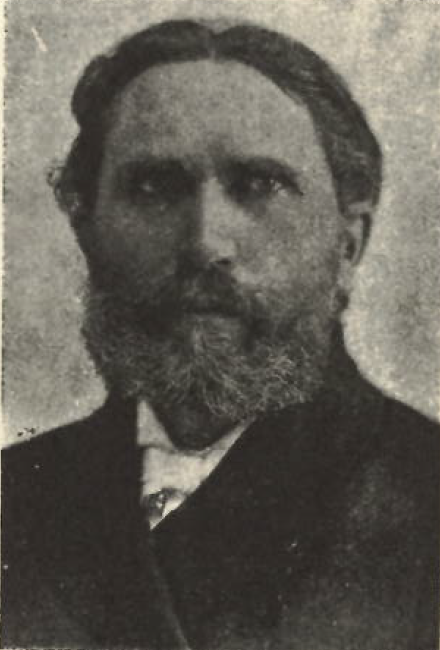
- From the Labour Annual (1900)
- Born: July 13, 1844; Thisted, Denmark
- Died: October 15, 1899 (aged 53); New York City, New York, U.S.
- Citizenship: Danish-American
- Occupations: Lawyer; writer; lecturer; political activist
- Spouses: Alma C. Holm (m. 1881; died 1888) Beulah Alice Boynton (m. 1895)

Laurence Gronlund (Danish: Lauritz Andreas Grønlund; July 13, 1844 – October 15, 1899) was a Danish-born American lawyer, writer, lecturer, and political activist. Gronlund is best remembered for his pioneering work in adapting the International Socialism of Karl Marx and Ferdinand Lassalle to the American idiom in his popular 1884 book, The Cooperative Commonwealth, and for his influence upon the thinking of utopian novelist Edward Bellamy, newspaper publisher Julius Wayland, and the American socialist movement of the 1880s and 1890s.

== Biography ==
=== Early years ===
Laurence Gronlund was born in Thisted, Denmark, on July 13, 1844, the son of Ane Lucie Grønlund and saddler maker's man L. Christensen.

Gronlund fought in the Danish–German War of 1864. He graduated from the University of Copenhagen's Faculty of Law in 1865, and emigrated to the United States two years later.

For a short time he taught German in a public school in Milwaukee prior to his 1869 admission to the bar and the opening of a law practice in Chicago.

Gronlund was converted to the ideas of socialism and gave up the practice of law in order that he might write and lecture on matters of collective ownership. He joined the German-American dominated Socialist Labor Party (SLP), a political party still in its infancy, and in 1878 published his first work, a pamphlet entitled The Coming Revolution: Its Principles. Gronlund was a firm advocate of trade union-based, German-style International Socialism, in contrast to various communitarian schemes then in vogue in the United States.

On 29 June 1881, Gronlund married Alma C. Holm in Boston, Massachusetts. Alma suffered from poor health and died in 1888.

=== The Cooperative Commonwealth ===
The first edition of Gronlund's The Cooperative Commonwealth was published in Boston in 1884

In 1884 Gronlund published his most influential and best remembered work, a small volume titled The Cooperative Commonwealth. This book attempted to popularize Karl Marx's ideas about the labor theory of value and the fundamentally exploitative nature of competition within the capitalist system. The working class, forced to scramble for survival under the competitive system, was depicted as the "natural prey" of small shopkeeper "parasites" who existed by inflating selling prices and depreciating quality. Moreover, the "big capitalists" were said to wield a still more powerful weapon, that of combination, which made possible more efficient "fleecings" of working people.

The capitalist system contained within itself a "fatal contradiction", Gronlund argued – an inherent tendency towards "overproduction", production at a higher level than the purchasing power of consumers:

Since ... Labor under our wage-system, our profit-system, our fleecings-system, only receives about one half [of the value of its production] as its share, it follows that the producers cannot buy back that which they create. * * * For the more Capital is being accumulated in private hands, the more impossible this wage-system renders it for the producers to buy what they produce. The more necessary it becomes for capitalists to dispose of their ever increasing fleecings, the less the ability of the people to purchase them will, relatively become. ... The more Capital, the more 'overproduction.'

Individualism in production, although efficient in causing Capital to grow, was simultaneously "digging the grave of Capital", Gronlund declared.

With Marx's Das Kapital still unavailable in English translation during the decade of the 1880s, Gronlund's reinterpretation of Marx into the American vernacular was revelatory, although he mentioned Marx's name "only once or twice in the book". More than 100,000 copies of The Cooperative Commonwealth were sold, and the book would remain one of the most influential works on the socialist theme in the United States for the rest of the 19th century.

According to historian Rudolf Kirk, The Cooperative Commonwealth reflects Gronlund's distinctly Christian interpretation of Marx.

=== Later writings ===
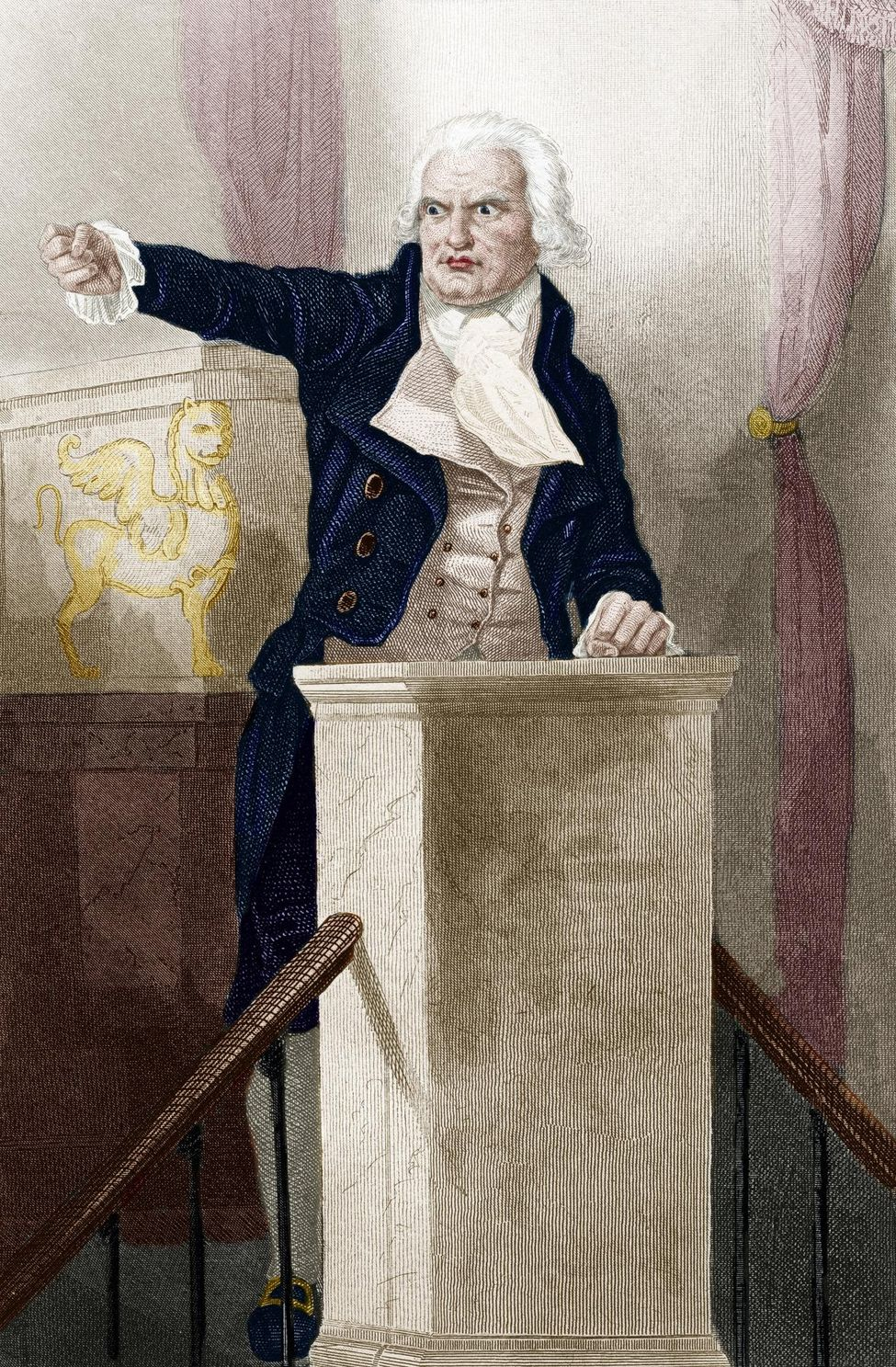
Gronlund's second book, Ça ira!, was a reevaluation of the role of French revolutionary Georges Jacques Danton (1759–1794)

After having lived in the United States for 20 years, in 1885 Gronlund made an extended stay to Great Britain, where he would remain for two years. Gronlund spent his time in Britain lecturing on socialist themes to both political and academic audiences, touching on both current politics and historical themes in speeches made across England and Scotland.

Gronlund returned to his adopted country in 1887 and resumed his activism on behalf of the Socialist Labor Party. Gronlund was immediately called upon by the SLP to differentiate its views from the single tax program of Henry George, an 1886 candidate for mayor of New York City on the ticket of the upstart United Labor Party which the SLP had actively supported. The result of this assignment was two pamphlets, Socialism vs. Single Tax and Insufficiency of Henry George's Theory.

The departure of the SLP from the broader United Labor Party of which it was a part was civil, with Gronlund remarking in a June 1887 lecture at New York City that Henry George was

... a most noble man, the starting wedge for socialism in the United States, but his theory is insufficient and his remedies would not accomplish what he believes. When it comes down to the kernel of the matter, he is radically different from us and we must part company from him.

Gronlund turned his attention to history with the publication of his second book, a reevaluation of the life and activities of French Jacobin revolutionary Georges Danton in the French Revolution of 1789 to 1794. At the end of his life Gronlund regarded this 1887 work, Ça Ira! or Danton in the French Revolution, as his most important work. In his book Gronlund attempted to challenge the popular image of Danton, first President of the Committee of Public Safety, as a terrorist and to restore his place to history as a leader of the democratic French revolution.

A member of the National Executive Committee of the Socialist Labor Party in 1888, Gronlund broke with the party soon after, ostensibly over its decision to open a saloon on Fourth Street in New York City as a means of generating funds for use of the party.

Late in 1890 Gronlund published his third book, an "essay in ethics" entitled Our Destiny: The Influence of Socialism on Morals and Religion. This work touches upon the quasi-religious aspect of the socialist project. Gronlund argued that socialism had two sides, a "good kind" of "mutual good will and mutual help" as well as a negative socialism of "hatred and spoliation." Gronlund supported "mutual good will and mutual help," at the time best expressed in the United States by the emerging movement built around Nationalist Clubs. Gronlund noted with bemusement that while people shuddered in fear of "destructive Socialism," at the same time the concentration of capitalism through trusts and increased government intervention in economic affairs was slowly bringing into existence a socialist regime.

=== Final years ===
Gronlund devoted himself almost exclusively to lecturing until his appointment to a poorly-paid position in the office of the Bureau of Labor in Washington, D.C., where he worked for Commissioner of Labor Carroll D. Wright.

In the early 1890s, Gronlund visited and spoke at the Church of the Carpenter in Boston, founded by the Christian Socialist minister W. D. P. Bliss. Gronlund also contributed to The Dawn, the journal of the Society of Christian Socialists.

Following the end of his stint with the Bureau of Labor in 1893, Gronlund rededicated himself as a touring lecturer dealing with socialist themes. He was a speaker at a Congress of Economics held in conjunction with the 1893 Chicago World's Fair, speaking there alongside Henry George and Richard T. Ely. He also spoke to a variety of audiences from coast to coast, including forays into Utah and California.

Owing to misgivings about the term "socialism" – which he believed covered too many bedfellows, such as anarchists and communitarians – Gronlund insisted upon describing himself as a "collectivist" in his later years on the lecture circuit. Despite this change in nomenclature, Gronlund remained orthodox in his socialist views, as he explained in one 1894 newspaper interview:

As collectivists, we do not approve of the violent methods of the European [revolutionary] socialists. We want the gradual absorption of all capital by the government in a peaceable manner. We are satisfied to work with the Populists, or with Henry George, or with those who advocate government ownership of railroads, for they are all in the same line with us, though we go much farther. We would say government ownership of railways, banks, telegraph lines, factories, mills, workshops, and all industries; also government ownership of land, for land is capital. The government would be the employer, the people the employed, and there would be no conflict of interest.

In addition to lecturing to audiences around the country about "collectivism", Gronlund plied his trade as a writer, contributing to the pages of Twentieth Century Magazine. Gronlund spoke not only to English-speaking audiences, but also spoke in his native Danish to members of the Scandinavian immigrant community during his travels around the United States.

Gronlund was enthusiastic about the ideas and tactics of the Fabian Society in Great Britain and sought to emulate the Fabian movement on American soil, explicitly declared in 1895 that "this movement is evolutionary, not revolutionary."

On 24 December 1895 in Seattle, Washington, Gronlund married Beulah Alice Carey (née Boynton). Beulah was regarded as a talented artist and art teacher and was active in launching the Seattle Humane Society, dedicated to the prevention of cruelty to animals.

A fourth and final book, The New Economy: A Peaceable Solution of the Social Problem, was published in 1898 and emphasized the evolutionary and anti-class war orientation which Gronlund developed in his later years.

=== Death and legacy ===
Gronlund as he was depicted in a newspaper story in 1895.

Laurence Gronlund died October 15, 1899, in New York City, at the age of 53.

At the time of his death Gronlund was remembered critically but warmly in the American socialist press. Writing in the Social Democratic Herald, Secretary of the Social Democratic Party of America Seymour Stedman remembered him as a proverbial absent-minded professor:

He was eccentric and careless. He would walk with pipe and paper along a thriving thoroughfare oblivious of all; his hat shaped like a French general's, peak in front and back; shoes well worn; clothes shabby, and was in meeting reticent, even timid ... He treated the subject of Socialism plainly and stripped it of utopianism. ... The peoples of the future will dwell in peace where this hardy pioneer warred with the accumulated prejudice, passions, and ignorance of the ages.

Leonard D. Abbott recalled Gronlund as a "great soul" who had lived in poverty throughout his life out of commitment to the socialist cause, the recipient of "very small financial rewards from all his books put together." He quoted Gronlund during his last year of life as rejecting the political strategy of winning power through independent political action, declaring "I regard [Eugene] Debs as the most unselfish of labor leaders, but you can't build up a third party in this county – you've got to work through the Democratic Party."

Gronlund was enormously influential during the decades of the 1880s and 1890s and is credited by historian Daniel Bell with playing a pivotal role in the conversion of future Appeal to Reason publisher Julius Wayland to socialism in 1891. Wayland would begin his first socialist newspaper, The Coming Nation, in 1893 and would build his subsequent publication into a mass circulation weekly that would help make socialism a broad political movement during the first two decades of the 20th century.

Gronlund's articulation of a vision for a cooperative economy and society echoed over the next decades in early-twentieth century U.S. and Canadian leftist circles. In Upton Sinclair's 1924 novel Millennium, survivors of a world-wide apocalyptic explosion build what they called a "co-operative commonwealth". Gronlund's writings helped lead to the 1932 formation of Canada's Co-operative Commonwealth Federation party, which became the largest left-wing political party in that country and continues to this day as the New Democratic Party. His writings also helped shape the economic principles of the U.S. Farmer-Labor Party. They were instrumental in the FLP's Minnesota affiliate, where advocacy for a Cooperative Commonwealth formed the central theme of the Party's platform from 1934 until its merging with the state Democratic Party in 1944.

== Works ==
- The Coming Revolution: Its Principles. St. Louis, MO: Slawson & Pierrot, 1878.
- The Co-operative Commonwealth in its Outlines: An Exposition of Modern Socialism. Boston: Lee and Shepard, 1884.
- "The Work Before Us," The Commonweal, no. 1 (July 1885), pp. 61–62.
- Insufficiency of Henry George's Theory. New York: New York Labor News Co., 1887.
- Socialism vs. Tax Reform: An Answer to Henry George. New York: New York Labor News Co., 1887.
- "Les Socialism Aus Etats-Unis," Revue d'economic politique, no. 1 (March-April 1887), pp. 109–124.
- "A Lesson of Trusts," The Leader, July 28, 1887.
- Ça Ira! or Danton in the French Revolution. Boston: Lee and Shepard, 1887.
- "The Nationalization of Industry," The Nationalist [Boston], vol. 1, no. 2 (June 1889), pp. 33–36.
- "Christian Socialism in America," Christian Register, vol. 67 (June 13, 1889), p. 4.
- "Reply to Dr. Heber Newton," The Nationalist [Boston], vol. 1, no. 5 (Sept. 1889), pp. 158–161.
- "Nationalism," The Arena, vol. 1, whole no. 2 (January 1890), pp. 153–165.
- "Godin's Social Palace," The Arena, vol. 1 (May 1890), pp. 691–699.
- "Why I Am a Socialist," Twentieth Century, vol. 4, no. 19 (May 8, 1890).
- Our Destiny: The Influence of Socialism on Morals and Religion: An Essay in Ethics. London: Swan Sonnenschein & Co., 1890.
- "Lettre à Benoit Malon à Paris de Laurence Gronlund à Washington, DC, le 20 Juin 1892," Le Revue Socialiste, vol. 16 (1892), pp. 244–248.
- "Le Socialism Comme Probleme Moral et National," Revue d'economic politique, no. 6 (Feb. 1892), pp. 261–267.
- "What to Do?" Twentieth Century, vol. 8, no. 13 (Aug.–Dec. 1894), p. 5.
- "Studies in Ultimate Society: A New Interpretation of Life," The Arena, vol. 18 (1897), pp. 351–361.
- The New Economy: A Peaceable Solution of the Social Problem. Chicago, IL: Herbert S. Stone & Co., 1898.
- "A Weak Argument: Berger's Platform Analyzed and Its Defects Pointed Out," The Social Democrat [Chicago], vol. 5, no. 24 (June 23, 1898), pg. 1.
- Three in One: A Trinity of Arguments in Favor of Social Democracy. With G.C. Clemens and G.A. Hoehn. Chicago: Social Democracy of America, 1898.
- "The Sugar Beet from the Standpoint of National Economy," Ranch and Range [Seattle], vol. 15, no. 35 (August 15, 1899), pg. 1.
- "Socializing a State," in G.C. Clemens, A Primer on Socialism. Progressive Thought, whole no. 13 (Oct. 1900), pp. 16–22.
- "Modern Social Anarchy," Wilshire's Magazine, whole no. 51 (Oct. 1902), pp. 24–28.
