= Edward Bellamy (disambiguation) =

Edward Bellamy (1850–1898), was an American author and socialist.

Edward Bellamy may also refer to:

- Edward Bellamy (banker) (died 1749), Governor of the Bank of England and Lord Mayor of London

== See also ==
- Edward Bellamy House, Chicopee, Massachusetts
- Ned Bellamy (born 1957), American actor
