= The Nationalist (United States) =

Cover of The Nationalist for December 1889. A publisher's rubberstamp on the cover indicates a print run of 35,000 copies for the issue.

The Nationalist was an American socialist magazine established in Boston, Massachusetts in May 1889 by adherents of the utopian ideas of writer Edward Bellamy in his 1888 book, Looking Backward. Published by a "Nationalist Educational Association" closely associated with Nationalist Club No. 1 of Boston, the magazine served as the national organ of the Bellamyite movement in the United States until being supplanted by the weekly newspaper The New Nation in 1891.

== Publication history ==
=== Background ===
The January 1888 publication of the utopian socialist economic novel Looking Backward: 2000-1887, by Edward Bellamy was greeted with acclaim in a small circle of intellectual society, primarily in Boston, home of the book's publisher, Tichenor and Company. Boston Globe journalist Cyrus Field Willard was among the first of those moved to political activity by the book's economic vision, and he wrote to the author, asking for Bellamy's blessings for the establishment of "an association to spread the ideas in your book." Bellamy had responded to Willard's appeal positively, urging him in a July 4 letter:

"Go ahead by all means and do it if you can find anyone to associate with. No doubt eventually the formation of such Nationalist Clubs or associations among our sympathizers all over the country will be a proper measure and it is fitting that Boston should lead off in this movement."

No formal organization immediately followed based upon Willard's efforts, however, and it was not until early September 1888 that an entity known as the "Boston Bellamy Club" independently emerged, with Charles E. Bowers and Civil War General Arthur F. Deveraux playing the decisive organizing role. The following month Willard's small Nationalist circle joined forces with the Boston Bellamy Club, establishing "a permanent organization to further the Nationalization of industry." The first regular meeting of this remade organization, the First Nationalist Club of Boston, was held on December 1, 1888, attended by 25 interested participants, with Charles E. Bowers elected chairman. A committee of 5 was established to create a plan for a permanent organization, including Boston Herald editorial writer Sylvester Baxter, Willard, Devereaux, Bowers, and Christian socialist clergyman W.D.P. Bliss.

The genteel First Club of Boston would have 107 members by the end of 1889, adding to its ranks author Edward Everett Hale, magazine editor William Dean Howells, and prominent socialist writer Laurence Gronlund. The group would dominate the initial phase of the American Nationalist movement. It would be this local group which, through a publishing arm known as the Nationalist Educational Association, would launch The Nationalist in May 1889 as a vehicle to extend Nationalist philosophy and political ideas to the general public.

=== Establishment ===
The first issue of The Nationalist bore a cover date of May 1889 and contained a Declaration of Principles inside its front cover that made the group's perfectionist goals, declaring:

"The principle of the Brotherhood of Humanity is one of the eternal truths that govern the world's progress on lines which distinguish human nature from brute nature. The principle of competition is simply the application of the brutal law of the survival of the strongest and most cunning. Therefore, so long as competition continues to be the ruling factor in our industrial system, the highest development of the individual cannot be reached, the loftiest aims of humanity cannot be realized."

First Editor of the publication was Henry Willard Austin, a graduate of Harvard College, lawyer, poet, Theosophist — and alcoholic. His tenure at the editorial helm would be brief, replaced by an English émigré, attorney John Storer Cobb.

=== Development and demise ===
The publication never managed to achieve a mass circulation of paid subscribers, peaking at about 9,000.

As expenses began to outpace revenues, effort was made to bolster the flagging publication by adding Edward Bellamy himself to the editorial staff. Due to the author's ill health this effort came to naught, however, effectively sealing the erudite magazine's fate.

Deeply in debt and with its potential readership undercut by the January 1891 appearance of Edward Bellamy's weekly newspaper The New Nation, the final issue of The Nationalist appeared under a cover date of "March–April 1891." The publication's demise marked the end of the early "philosophical" phase of the Nationalist movement and the rise in influence of those seeking concrete political action to implement Bellamy's vision in the United States.
