= Nationalist (disambiguation) =

A nationalist refers to anything associated with or part of nationalism, an idea or movement that promotes the interests of a particular nation.

A Nationalist may refer to an adherent of:

== Political organizations ==
- Kuomintang, "The Nationalists" of China, members of a political organization established in 1894 by Sun Yat-sen
- Nationalist faction (Spanish Civil War), "The Nationalists" of the Spanish Civil War led by Francisco Franco
- Nationalist Clubs, "The Nationalists" belonging to an American political movement advancing the ideas of Edward Bellamy
- Nationalist Movement, a political organization based in the U.S. state of Mississippi
- Nationalist Party (Iceland), a political party existing from 1934 to 1944
- National Party (South Africa), a political party existing from 1915 to 1997, often referred to as Nationalists
- Nazi Party, a political party existing in Germany between 1920 and 1945, officially named the National Socialist German Workers' Party

== Pertaining to regions and nation-states ==
- Arab nationalism
- African nationalism
- American nationalism
- Armenian nationalism
- Baloch nationalism
- Bangladeshi nationalism
- Basque nationalism
- Belgian nationalism
- Bodo nationalism
- Bulgarian nationalism
- Breton nationalism
- British nationalism
- Canadian nationalism
- Chinese nationalism
- Cornish nationalism
- Corsican nationalism
- Croatian nationalism
- English nationalism
- French nationalism
- Galician nationalism
- German nationalism
- Greek nationalism
- Icelandic nationalism
- Indian nationalism
- Irish nationalism
- Japanese nationalism
- Korean nationalism
- Kurdish nationalism
- Lebanese nationalism
- Muslim nationalism in South Asia
- Pan-European nationalism
- Pakistani nationalism
- Quebec nationalism
- Romanian nationalism
- Russian nationalism
- Scottish nationalism
- Serbian nationalism
- Slavic nationalism (disambiguation)
- Sinhalese Buddhist nationalism
- Spanish nationalism
- Tibetan nationalism
- Turkish nationalism
- Welsh nationalism
- Ulster nationalism

== Pertaining to races, religion or ideologies ==
- Black nationalism
- Hindu nationalism
- Left-wing nationalism
- Pan-nationalism
- Pan-Islamism
- Religious nationalism
- White nationalism

== See also ==
- The Nationalist (disambiguation), several publications
- National Party (disambiguation)
