= Joseph Conlin =

Joseph or Joe Conlin may refer to:

- Joseph H. Conlin, American impresario and opera director.
- Joseph R. Conlin, professor of American history
- Joe Conlin, American football coach

== See also ==
- Joseph Conlan, film and television composer
