= Society of Christian Socialists =

The Society of Christian Socialists (SCS), founded in Boston in 1889, was the first self-proclaimed Christian socialist organization in the United States.

== History ==
The primary figure in the creation of the SCS was William Dwight Porter Bliss, an Episcopal priest. Bliss had been interested in social problems and had been active in various groups to help advance the cause of labor. While he was in the First Nationalist Club of Boston, the most important group of the Bellamyite Nationalist movement, he broached the idea of forming a society that would espouse socialism from an explicitly Christian viewpoint. On February 18, 1889, Bliss, Francis Bellamy, A. G. Lawson, and sixteen others met at Tremont Temple to discuss the possibility. A declaration of principles was adopted on April 15, a constitution on April 24 and a meeting to effect permanent organization on May 7. The first issue of the group's magazine, The Dawn was issued on May 15.

Throughout its history, the main activity of the SCS was centered in Boston. A New York branch was established in February 1890, and state societies were formed in Ohio, based in Cincinnati, and Illinois, based in Chicago, in May of that year. Kansas followed with a state Christian Socialist Society based in Independence, Kansas, by August. Daniel De Leon's future wife, Bertha Canary was apparently a member. Notices of the activities of these groups in The Dawn, however, were sporadic compared to the consistent reports of meeting of the Boston society.

Beginning with the December 4, 1890, issue, The Dawn was relinquished as the society's periodical and became the private property of Bliss, with the understanding that a regular page would be devoted to the progress of the SCS. After this the chapters outside of Boston gradually became dormant. The last mention of activity in Cincinnati was on December 18, 1890, from New York in the January 29, 1891, and from Chicago in the February 12, 1891, issue. The last mention of a meeting of the Boston society is in the May 1 issue, with this note:

In Boston, as everywhere, the Society finds great difficulty in extending its organization ... it would be most desirable and have greatest use, if the Society had organizers and means to rapidly push and extend its membership, for that would mean still further extension of its thought.

== See also ==
- Church of the Carpenter
