= New Nation (United States) =

1891–1894 newspaper in Massachusetts, US

Cover of volume 1, number 1 of Edward Bellamy's The New Nation, dated January 31, 1891.

The New Nation was a weekly newspaper launched in Boston, Massachusetts in January 1891 by the American socialist writer Edward Bellamy. The paper served as a de facto national organ of the nationwide network of Nationalist Clubs and expounded upon their activities and political ideas, which derived from the best-selling 1888 novel Looking Backward.

The paper soon became an advocate of the policies of the fledgling People's Party before ceasing publication due to diminishing subscriptions in the aftermath of the Depression of 1893.

== Publication history ==
=== Background ===
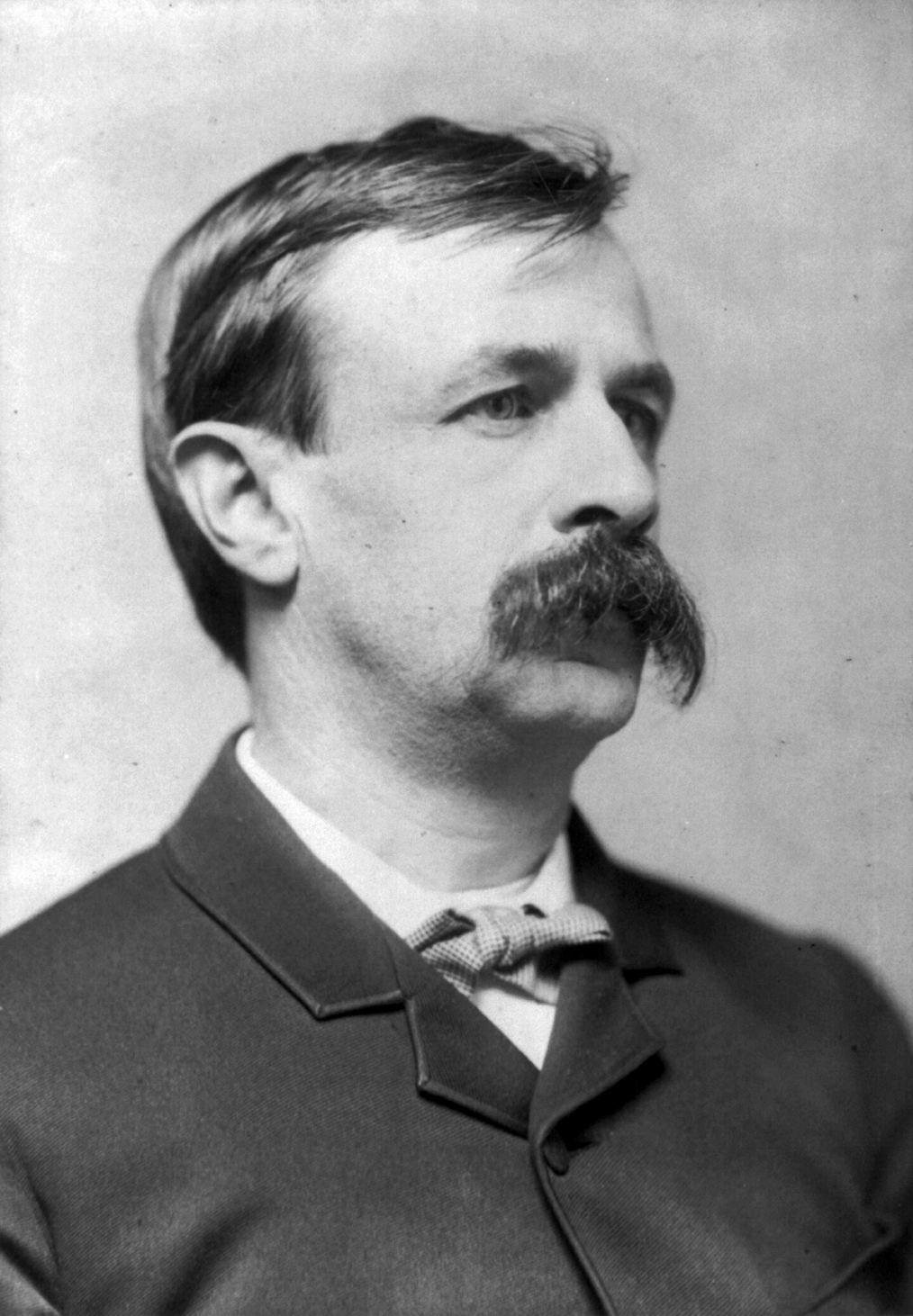
Editor and publisher Edward Bellamy as he appeared in the late 1880s.

The years of the late 1870s and 1880s were marked by a series of strikes and economic crises in the United States — problems which raised questions about the basic structure of the American economy in the minds of many American intellectuals. For some, a prospective answer lay in the pages of writer Edward Bellamy's 1888 work of utopian imagination, Looking Backward, 2000-1887, which imaginatively depicted a future world of organized and regimented economic production and social peace.

In a case of attempting to cause life to imitate art, a network of so-called Nationalist Clubs sprung to life in 1889, emerging first in the city of Boston. A monthly magazine called The Nationalist was produced by Boston Club No. 1 which came to serve as the de facto national organ of this socialist political movement, in the wake of which a spate of local newspapers were either launched or which lent support to the burgeoning movement. It was estimated by one prominent participant, Boston journalist Cyrus Field Willard, that by the end of 1889 some 50 newspapers existed which could be counted as supporting this growing national movement, which in the states of the Northeast and California came to resemble a mainstream political fad.

Despite its leading place in the movement, The Nationalist proved to be financially unsuccessful, however, and in 1890 it was suggested to Bellamy by the Boston club that he take over the editorial helm of the magazine. Bellamy was in ill health, however, suffering from a bout of influenza, and he was forced for a time to forgo taking a seat at the editorial desk. By the end of the year, the magazine was deeply in debt, kept in operation only through the grace of subscriber donations.

Bellamy remained committed to building a political movement around his economic ideas, but came to see The Nationalist as a flawed and waning organ of expression. He instead sought to establish a new nationwide newspaper to assume the lead of the vigorous alliance of local Nationalist clubs. A new weekly newspaper, The New Nation would be this successor publication.

=== Establishment ===
Bellamy made Boston the home of The New Nation and made use of the mailing list of The Nationalist to enlist subscribers for the new publication. Bellamy assumed the role of editor and publisher, with Henry R. Legate of the Second Nationalist Club of Boston his assistant and Amherst College graduate Mason Green the publication's initial business manager.

The first issue of The New Nation rolled off the presses dated January 31, 1891. It published an initial manifesto which declared its purpose to be the criticism of "the existing economic system as radically wrong in morals and preposterous economically" and to advance instead a "plan of national industrial cooperation, aiming to bring about the economic equality of citizens..."

=== Development ===
The New Nation stood in marked contrast to the somewhat apolitical editorial line of The Nationalist, which limited itself to a more abstract and philosophical perspective. Opinion and news relating to contemporary political issues dominated the pages of the new small-format 16-page weekly, which was visually similar to the venerable liberal weekly The Nation.

Although it was designed to reach and appeal to a large general audience, The New Nation was unsuccessful in gaining a mass readership, with the publication probably never exceeding 8,000 copies in circulation.

The relative lack of success of the publication was not for the lack of Bellamy's trying. The novelist abandoned his literary work to dedicate himself to contemporary issues and practical politics and "threw himself into the work of inspiring in others the faith that was in him," Mason Green later recalled, adding that "the man of letters was now a man of action."

Bellamy continue to reside in his small hometown of Chicopee Falls, making the commute to Boston each week to work on the newspaper, which occupied his hours from Wednesday through Saturday. Bellamy composed editorials for the paper and came out of his temperamental isolation to deliver short political speeches and attend meetings in support of the Nationalist political movement.

=== Demise ===
The early 1890s saw the emergence of a new political party, the People's Party, commonly known as "The Populists," which put forward a radical reform agenda against monopoly and advancing an agenda appealing to the practical needs of American farmers. Discouraged by the "old parties" of the nation, the Nationalists were strongly supportive of those pushing forward the idea of such a new political organization and lent them support in the pages of The New Nation from 1890.

The Nationalists also directly participated in the organizational convention of the new political party held in St. Louis in 1892. Bellamy and The New Nation attempted to advance a perspective that was both friendly and aloof from the new party, declaring to his adherents that "nationalism is a movement and not a party" and that the role of the Nationalists was to influence a broad spectrum of reform organizations. Despite these efforts, severe attenuation of Nationalism as an independent political movement followed with local Bellamy clubs being rapidly supplanted by local units of the nascent political reform party.

The Economic Panic of 1893 put additional stress on the movement, reducing organizational strength and putting The New Nation under financial strain. With his finances dwindling and beginning to suffer from the tuberculosis which would eventually kill him, Bellamy suspended publication of The New Nation in 1894. He also wanted to concentrate upon writing a new political novel to carry forward the story of his protagonist in Looking Backward, a book published in 1897 as Equality.

Bellamy would die in May 1898, at the age of 48, shortly after publication of his final novel.
