= Church of the Carpenter =

Episcopal congregation in Boston (1890–1896)

The Church of the Carpenter was a mission of the Episcopal Church associated with the Society of Christian Socialists in Boston. Its congregation was known as the Brotherhood of the Carpenter. Founded in 1890 by the Reverend William Dwight Porter Bliss, the church sought to promote the cause of economic justice and influenced many of its members to take an active interest in the labor movement. Notable members included educator and activist Vida Dutton Scudder, sculptor Anne Whitney, novelist William Dean Howells, poet Robert Treat Paine Jr., city planner Mary Kingsbury Simkhovitch, and photographer Francis Watts Lee.

== History ==
On Sunday, April 13, 1890, the Reverend William Dwight Porter Bliss held the first service of the Church of the Carpenter in Brunswick Hall, 241 Tremont Street, Boston. Bliss explained his intent to the audience that crowded the hall:

We are not here to commence a revolution. We are here simply, quietly, humbly to consider the application to social problems of the old gospel of the carpenter who lived in Nazareth...

Change is everywhere. Christendom today is heaving with a divine unrest, as she has not moved since the days that preceded the Protestant reformation. Tolstoi in Russia, Stuart Headlam in London, Dr. McGlynn in New York city, voices in the Greek, the Anglican, the Roman Catholic communion, all speak of change, and they all move in one direction, the application of Christianity to social life...

The church of the carpenter is the church of the Son of Man. It is the church of humanity. It means sacrifice, the sacrifice of the individual, the sacrifice of self for the good of all. This is Christian socialism....we must work through the State and better the conditions of men as well as work through individuals.

The Church of the Carpenter was not a new denomination or sect, but a mission of the Episcopal Church under Bishop Phillips Brooks. It was incorporated as a parish of the Diocese of Boston, with Bliss as rector, on June 5, 1892. The church followed the Episcopal liturgy, but welcomed people "of any church or of no church". In 1892 the church was located in the Wendell Phillips Hall at 812 Washington Street; in 1893 it moved to 3 Boylston Place. Notable members included educator and activist Vida Dutton Scudder, sculptor Anne Whitney, novelist William Dean Howells, poet Robert Treat Paine, Jr., city planner Mary Kingsbury Simkhovitch, and photographer Francis Watts Lee. The socialist writer Laurence Gronlund spoke at the church and contributed to The Dawn, a Christian Socialist journal edited by Bliss. Robertson James, the younger brother of Henry James, attended the church and wrote an article for The Dawn about his father's socialist leanings. Other notable visitors included the Reverend R. Heber Newton, economist Richard T. Ely, and authors Edward Everett Hale, Edward Bellamy, and Hamlin Garland.

Bliss served as rector of the parish from 1890 to 1894 before embarking on a career as a traveling lecturer for the Christian Socialist Union. The church disbanded in 1896.

== Influence ==
In her memoir, Simkhovitch cites the church as an important influence on her while she was still in college. At the time, there was a bookshop on the ground floor, and a reading room and chapel on the second floor. Its senior and junior wardens were prominent union organizers. On Sundays, the Brotherhood held "supper meetings" in the basement, where they discussed social problems of the day. The church influenced many young people to take an interest in the labor movement, including the socialist priest Percy Stickney Grant, who was a frequent visitor. Bliss's ministry inspired Herbert Newton Casson to found the Labor Church in Lynn, Massachusetts, in 1894.

Towards the end of his life, Bliss characterized himself as a middle-class reformer who attracted "more leaders than led", and recalled "many mistakes and short-comings" in his organization of the Church of the Carpenter. "I would hesitate long before advising a young clergyman to start its counterpart today. Perhaps it may teach what not to do. But it was a beginning, and it's necessary to begin."
