= The Nationalist =

The Nationalist can refer to several publications:

- The Nationalist (1889) (1889-1891), the official magazine of the Nationalist Clubs published in Boston
- The Nationalist (Carlow), a newspaper in Ireland
- The Nationalist (Tipperary), a newspaper in Ireland
- The Nationalist (United States), formerly a Socialist magazine established in Boston
- The Nationalist (Mobile, Alabama), a former post-American Civil War era newspaper for African Americans
