= Herbert Newton Casson =

Canadian journalist and writer (1869–1951)

Herbert Newton Casson (September 23, 1869 – September 4, 1951) was a Canadian journalist and author who wrote primarily about technology and business.

== Life and work ==
Casson was born in Odessa, Ontario. His father was the Reverend Wesley Casson, a Methodist missionary, and his mother was Elizabeth Jackson, related to the Ulster Jacksons and Confederate General Stonewall Jackson. The family moved around due to Casson's father's postings. After spending years in Manitoba, the family went back to Ontario in 1880, just before the outbreak of the North-West Rebellion. With no formal schooling, Casson turned to the world around him for education. Casson went to Victoria College in 1890 hoping to study philosophy, but was instead given a theology scholarship. He graduated with a dual degree in 1892.

At twenty-three, Casson became an ordained Methodist minister, but was soon tried for heresy and, after being found guilty, resigned his position. He moved to Boston in 1893 and started his career in the publishing field. While in Boston, Casson's attention was called to the immigrant slums. He was so shocked by the conditions he found there, he became a socialist, leading demonstrations and making friends with Keir Hardie in 1897 (British Socialist leader) and Samuel Gompers (American Trade Union). With Hardie he helped form the Independent Labour Party. Then with Walter Vrooman, married to heiress Amne Grafflin, Casson helped buy a college for leaders, flourishing since as Ruskin College at Oxford in 1899. He was inspired by Anglican Christian socialist William Dwight Porter Bliss's ministry in the Church of the Carpenter to found a Labor Church in Lynn, Massachusetts, in 1894. Deserted by his followers for opposing the 1898 Spanish–American War, Casson moved to the Ruskin Colony, a socialist commune in Tennessee started by Julius Wayland. He left after six months and went to Toledo and worked alongside Samuel M. Jones and ghost-wrote the book The Eight Hour Day.

Casson married Lydia Kingsmill Commander just before moving to New York and starting work at New York Evening Journal with Arthur Brisbane under William Randolph Hearst in 1901. He then worked for the New York World, a paper run by Joseph Pulitzer, until 1902. During his career as a journalist, Casson interviewed the likes of then presidents Grover Cleveland, Benjamin Harrison, Theodore Roosevelt, and Woodrow Wilson, and Guglielmo Marconi, Nikola Tesla, Thomas Edison, and Alexander Graham Bell. Casson then joined Frank A. Munsey from 1905 until 1907 as a special writer resulting in Casson's first book, The Romance of Steel: The Story of a Thousand Millionaires, published in 1907. It detailed the rise of the American steel industry during the late 19th century. Casson also met the Wright Brothers and wrote the notable article, "At Last We Can Fly".

In 1908, Casson was invited by efficiency experts Harrington Emerson and Frederick Winslow Taylor to become an associate in the movement. He also freelanced for American Magazine in 1909. Casson then wrote History of the Telephone in 1910. From the preface: "Thirty-five short years, and presto! the newborn art of telephony is fullgrown. Three million telephones are now scattered abroad in foreign countries, and seven millions are massed here, in the land of its birth." In 1911, Casson partnered with H. K. McCann and organized the famous advertising company, selling out in 1914.

Casson retired in 1914 and moved his family to England. During World War I, Casson gave lectures on the management of factories. He founded the journal Efficiency, which he both published and wrote, in 1915. Casson continued to write and publish until 1950, when he went on a lecturing tour to Australia, New Zealand and Fiji. Casson wrote 168 books on business success. He died at home in Norwood, Surrey, on September 4, 1951, shortly after returning.

== Private life ==
At the Ruskin Colony, he met Lydia Kingsmill Commander. They were married in two ceremonies: on March 5, 1899 and on May 4, 1899. After the second marriage ceremony, they told the press that Lydia would not take Herbert's name — a decision regarded as unusual at the time. They separated around 1915.

== Selected works by Herbert N. Casson ==
- Organized Self-Help. New York: P. Eckler, 1901.
- The Romance of Steel, London: Grant Richards, 1907.
- The Romance of the Reaper. New York: Doubleday, Page, 1908.
- Cyrus Hall McCormick: His Life and Work. Chicago: A. C. McClurg & Co., 1909.
- The History of the Telephone, Chicago: H. C. McClurg & Co, 1910.
- The Effect of the Telephone on Modern Industrial and Social Life, New York: New York Electrical Society, 1910.
- Ads and Sales: A Study of Advertising and Selling, from the Standpoint of the New Principles of Scientific Management, Chicago: A. C. McClurg & Co., 1911.
- Horse, Truck, and Tractor: The Coming of Cheaper Power for City and Farm, Chicago: F.G. Browne & Co., 1913. Joint authors: Rollin W. Hutchinson, L.W. Ellis et al.
- Lectures on Efficiency, etc., Manchester: Mather & Platt, 1917.
- The Casson Office Course, London: Efficiency Magazine, [1918] - issued in 12 parts.
- How to Keep Your Money and Make It Earn More, New York City: B. C. Forbes Pub. Co., 1923.
- The Story of Artificial Silk, London: The Efficiency Magazine, 1928.
- The Story of My Life, London: Efficiency Magazine, 1931.
- Post-Hitler Europe, London: Efficiency Magazine, 1939.
- Courtesy in Business, Sydney: Angus & Robertson, 1939 (New Casson Business Library, 7)
- Fifty-two Ways to be Rich, Sydney: Angus & Robertson, 1939 (New Casson Business Library)
- How to Make Advertising Pay, Sydney: Angus & Robertson, 1939 (New Casson Business Library, 4)
- How to Build a Business, Sydney: Angus & Robertson, 1939 (New Casson Business Library, 6)
- Thinking in Business, Sydney: Angus & Robertson, 1939 (New Casson Business Library, 9)
- Brain Building for Achievement: A Complete Self-Instruction Course on the Development, Control, and Use of the Mental Powers, Bombay: D. B. Taraporvale (i.e. Taraporavale) Sons and Co. Ltd., n.d. (Taraporevala's "Self Improvement" Series)
