= Cyrus Field Willard =

American journalist, political activist and theosophist

Cyrus Field Willard (August 17, 1858 – January 17, 1942) was an American journalist, political activist, and theosophist. Deeply influenced by the writing of Edward Bellamy, Willard is best remembered as a principal in several utopian socialist enterprises, including the late 1890s colonization efforts of the Brotherhood of the Cooperative Commonwealth (BCC).

== Biography ==
=== Early years ===
Cyrus Field Willard was born August 17, 1858, in Lynn, Massachusetts, a member of a family of six children. The Willard family moved from Lynn to Boston in 1866, where Cyrus attended public school before gaining employment as a newspaper reporter for the Boston Globe.

In addition to working as a journalist, Willard contributed occasional pieces to the periodical press, including a humorous 1887 interview with poet Walt Whitman, "A Chat with the Good Grey Poet," published in The American Magazine.

Willard had a wide circle of political friends and acquaintances and maintained correspondence with prominent figures of the English and American socialist and anarchist movements, including William Morris, Sidney Webb, Benjamin R. Tucker, and Peter Kropotkin. Willard was additionally fluent in German, which enabled him to attend socialist meetings in the Boston area conducted in that language.

=== Nationalist ===
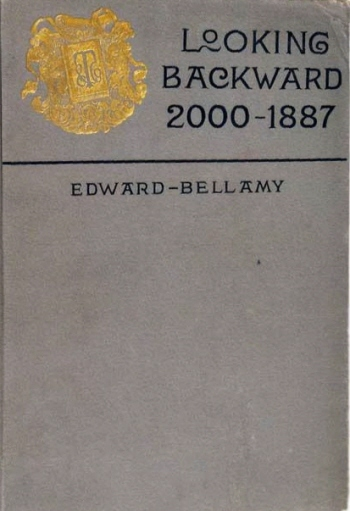
Willard was deeply influenced by Edward Bellamy's 1888 utopian novel Looking Backward, and spent more than a decade after its publication working as a socialist activist.

In 1888 writer Edward Bellamy published the book Looking Backward: 2000–1887, a best-selling work of utopian fiction which depicted a futuristic American society of coordinated production and ameliorated social problems. Although the book sold slowly following its initial release in January 1888, Cyrus Field Willard was one of the first to read the novel, published as it was in his hometown of Boston. A correspondence with Bellamy ensued, in which Willard suggested the possibility of establishing a network of local political groups to attempt to put Bellamy's fictional vision of the future into practical existence.

This idea was independently shared by another Boston journalist Sylvester Baxter, who similarly wrote to Bellamy with his concept. The pair were put into contact with one another and on December 1, 1888, an organizational meeting was held for what would be the first in a vast array of Nationalist Clubs. Willard as a co-founder of the Nationalist Club No. 1 became the group's Secretary.

From the outset Willard was deeply involved in attempts to build a broad Nationalist movement from coast to coast, contributing a regular column to the official organ of the group, the magazine The Nationalist. Willard was for a time from Bellamy and the Nationalist movement, hurt by his refusal to assume a leading role at The Nationalist and his subsequent decision to start instead a new weekly newspaper called The New Nation, making use of the financially failing magazine's subscriber list to build his own circulation. Willard lamented that Bellamy had abandoned "his truest friends" so as to "play at politics" with his Boston rivals Mason Green and Henry R. Legate, the latter of whom Willard believed to be a "corrupt politician."

Bellamy's foray into independent publishing would prove to be a short one, with his paper forced to terminate in 1894, with the Nationalist movement falling to pieces. Even after the demise of the movement proper, however, Willard maintained close relations with the author who had inspired it, attempting to bring the ill-and-dying Bellamy into the fold of the emerging American socialist movement.

=== Socialist ===
In 1897, Willard became active in the Social Democracy of America and the closely related Brotherhood of the Cooperative Commonwealth and its effort to establish a model socialist colony in a Western American state with a view to inspiring others to emulate the project and to eventually win political control of the state government. Willard was deeply committed to the colonization plan, which would ultimately lead to the defection of a minority faction to establish a more conventional political organization, the Social Democratic Party of America in 1898.

Together with Richard J. Hinton of Washington, DC, and Wilfred P. Borland of Bay City, Michigan, Willard was one of three central decision-makers in the selection of Washington as the group's target state. He and Borland were also place in charge of the purchasing of land there for colonization, making possible the establishment there of the Burley Colony.

In Washington the colonization effort abandoned the banner of the Social Democracy of America to become a new organization called the Cooperative Brotherhood. Willard played a leading role in this organization, appearing as the lead signatory on the group's deed of trust for purchase of communal land, and was additionally chosen as the first Secretary of the organization.

Willard would remain a resident of the Burley Colony for two years, before giving up on the project and leaving for the sunnier climes of Southern California.

=== Theosophist ===
Following his departure from the Burley Colony, Willard abandoned socialism and became deeply involved in the theosophy movement. He moved to Los Angeles and there established a local chapter of the Theosophical Society there. Willard had long been an adherent of spiritualism, having been introduced in 1884 when he first read Helena Blavatsky's seminal work, Isis Unveiled.

=== Mason ===
Willard was also an active Freemason, attaining the status of 32nd Degree. On October 1, 1928, Willard joined with other leading Masons in Cedar Rapids, Iowa, to launch the Philalethes Society, a Masonic research organization. The society was based upon the previously existing Académie Française and limited its membership to just 40 fellows, among whom was Willard. The organization continues to exist into the 21st Century and is regarded as the leading Masonic research and writing organization in North America.

=== Death and legacy ===
Willard died January 17, 1942, in San Diego, California. He was 83 years old at the time of his death.

Willard was the second cousin of Frances Willard, founder of the Women's Christian Temperance Union (WCTU) and prominent suffragist. Cyrus Willard claimed to have played a significant role in the shaping of his cousin's political views, recalling in his autobiography, "I had a pile of correspondence with her four inches tall and converted her to the proposition that poverty caused as much intemperance as intemperance caused poverty."

== Ancestry ==
Cyrus Field Willard was a 5th great-grandson (8th generation descendant) of the Massachusetts colonist Simon Willard (1605–1676).

== Works ==
- "The Nationalist Club of Boston: A Chapter of History," The Nationalist [Boston], vol. 1, no. 1 (May 1889), pp. 16–20.
- "The Social Democracy," The New Time [Chicago], vol. 1, no. 6 (Nov. 1897), pp. 337–338.
- "Brotherhood: The Hope of the World," Universal Brotherhood [New York], vol. 13, no. 6 (Sept. 1898), pp. 333–334.
- "The Higher Degrees in Germany," The New Age Magazine, vol. 26, no. 6 (June 1918), pp. 243–247.
- Autobiography of Cyrus Field Willard (manuscript). Morgan Collection, Houghton Library, Harvard University.
