= Francis Bellamy =

American Christian socialist minister (1855–1931)

The Reverend Francis Bellamy
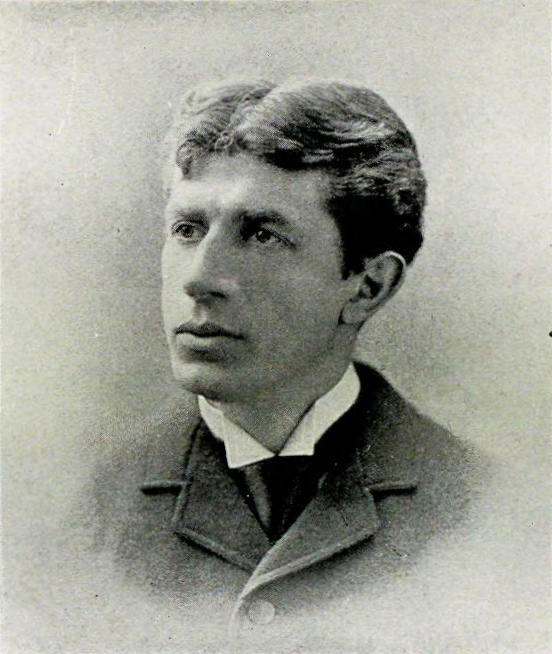
- Born: Francis Julius Bellamy; May 18, 1855; Mount Morris, New York, U.S.
- Died: August 28, 1931 (aged 76); Tampa, Florida, U.S.
- Resting place: Rome, New York, U.S.
- Education: University of Rochester
- Occupations: Minister; author; editor
- Era: Third Great Awakening
- Known for: Pledge of Allegiance
- Movement: Christian socialism

Francis Julius Bellamy (May 18, 1855 – August 28, 1931) was an American Christian socialist Baptist minister and author. He is best known for promoting an early version of the Pledge of Allegiance in 1892.

== Early life ==
Francis Julius Bellamy was born on May 18, 1855, in Mount Morris, New York, to Rev. David Bellamy (1806–1864) and Lucy Clark. His family was deeply involved in the Baptist church and both Francis and his father became ministers. The family moved to Rome, New York, when Francis was only five. There, Bellamy became an active member of the First Baptist Church where his father served as minister until his death in 1864. Francis went on to attend the University of Rochester in Rochester, New York, where he studied theology and belonged to the Alpha Delta Phi fraternity.

He became a Baptist minister as a young man. He was very much influenced by the vestiges of the Second Great Awakening. He travelled to promote his Baptist faith and lived to be of service to others in his community. Bellamy's travels brought him to Massachusetts where he penned the "Pledge of Allegiance" for a campaign by the Youth's Companion, a patriotic circular and magazine. Bellamy "believed in the absolute separation of church and state" and purposefully did not include the phrase "under God" in his pledge.

== Pledge of Allegiance ==
In 1891, Daniel Sharp Ford, the owner of the Youth's Companion, hired Bellamy to work with Ford's nephew James B. Upham in the magazine's premium department. In 1888, the Youth's Companion had begun a campaign to sell US flags to public schools as a premium to solicit subscriptions. For Upham and Bellamy, the flag promotion was more than merely a business move; under their influence, the Youth's Companion became a fervent supporter of the schoolhouse flag movement, which aimed to place a flag above every school in the nation. Four years later, by 1892, the magazine had sold US flags to approximately 26,000 schools. By this time the market was slowing for flags but was not yet saturated.

In 1892, Upham had the idea of using the 400th anniversary of Christopher Columbus reaching the Americas / Western Hemisphere in 1492 to further bolster the schoolhouse flag movement. The magazine called for a national Columbian Public School Celebration to coincide with the World's Columbian Exposition, then scheduled to be held in Chicago, Illinois, during 1893. A flag salute was to be part of the official program for the Columbus Day celebration on October 12 to be held in schools all over the US.

The pledge was published in the September 8, 1892, issue of the magazine, and immediately put to use in the campaign. Bellamy went to speak to a national meeting of school superintendents to promote the celebration; the convention liked the idea and selected a committee of leading educators to implement the program, including the immediate past president of the National Education Association. Bellamy was selected as the chair. Having received the official blessing of educators, Bellamy's committee now had the task of spreading the word across the nation and of designing an official program for schools to follow on the day of national celebration. He structured the program around a flag-raising ceremony and his pledge.

His original Pledge read as follows:

I pledge Allegiance to my Flag and to (Note: The word "to" was in his handwritten original but not the first published version, to which it was added in October 1892.) the Republic for which it stands, one Nation indivisible, with Liberty and Justice for all.

The recital was accompanied with a salute to the flag known as the Bellamy salute, described in detail by Bellamy. During World War II, the salute was replaced with a hand-over-heart gesture because the original form involved stretching the arm out towards the flag in a manner identical to the later Nazi salute. (For a history of the pledge, see Pledge of Allegiance).

In 1954, in response to the perceived threat of secular Communism, President Eisenhower encouraged Congress to add the words "under God," creating the 31-word pledge that is recited today.

Bellamy described his thoughts as he crafted the language of the pledge:

It began as an intensive communing with salient points of our national history, from the Declaration of Independence onwards; with the makings of the Constitution... with the meaning of the Civil War; with the aspiration of the people...

The true reason for allegiance to the Flag is the 'republic for which it stands'. ...And what does that last thing, the Republic mean? It is the concise political word for the Nation – the One Nation which the Civil War was fought to prove. To make that One Nation idea clear, we must specify that it is indivisible, as Webster and Lincoln used to repeat in their great speeches. And its future?

Just here arose the temptation of the historic slogan of the French Revolution which meant so much to Jefferson and his friends, 'Liberty, equality, fraternity'. No, that would be too fanciful, too many thousands of years off in realization. But we as a nation do stand square on the doctrine of liberty and justice for all...

Bellamy "viewed his Pledge as an 'inoculation' that would protect immigrants and native-born but insufficiently patriotic Americans from the 'virus' of radicalism and subversion."

In February 2022, Barry Popik tweeted a May 1892 newspaper report from Hays, Kansas, of a school flag-raising on 30 April accompanied by an almost identical pledge. An alternative theory is that the pledge was submitted to an 1890 patriotic competition in The Youth's Companion by a 13-year-old Kansas schoolboy, coincidentally named Frank E. Bellamy. Based on the inconsistency of the facts, some favor Frank E. Bellamy rather than Francis Bellamy as the originator.

== Political views ==
Bellamy was a Christian socialist, who "championed 'the rights of working people and the equal distribution of economic resources, which he believed was inherent in the teachings of Jesus.'" In 1891, Bellamy was "forced from his Boston pulpit for preaching against the evils of capitalism", and eventually stopped attending church altogether after moving to Florida, reportedly because of the racism he witnessed there. Francis's career as a preacher ended because of his tendency to describe Jesus as a socialist. In the 21st century, Bellamy is considered an early American democratic socialist.

Bellamy was a leader in the public education movement, the nationalization movement, and the Christian socialist movement. He united his grassroots network to start a collective memory activism in 1892.

French philosopher Henri de Saint-Simon's "new Christianity", which stressed using science to tackle poverty, influenced Bellamy and many of the "new St. Simonians." They saw nationalization (de-privatization) and public education as the policy solutions.

In 1889, Bellamy served as founding vice president and wrote several articles for the Society of Christian Socialists, a grassroots organization founded in Boston. The newspaper Dawn was run by his cousin Edward and Frances Willard. Francis Bellamy wrote about the Golden Rule and quoted Bible passages that denounced greed and lust for money. He was also chairman of the education committee.

Bellamy offered public education classes with topics such as "Jesus the socialist", "What is Christian Socialism?", and "Socialism versus anarchy". In 1891, Bellamy was asked to write down this last lecture, which called for a strong government and argued that only the socialist economy could allow both the worker and the owner to practice the golden rule. This essay, along with public relations experience, allowed him to coordinate a massive Columbus Day campaign.

On immigration and universal suffrage, Bellamy wrote in the editorial of The Illustrated American, Vol. XXII, No. 394, p. 258: "[a] democracy like ours cannot afford to throw itself open to the world where every man is a lawmaker, every dull-witted or fanatical immigrant admitted to our citizenship is a bane to the commonwealth." And further: "Where all classes of society merge insensibly into one another every alien immigrant of inferior race may bring corruption to the stock. There are races more or less akin to our own whom we may admit freely and get nothing but advantage by the infusion of their wholesome blood. But there are other races, which we cannot assimilate without lowering our racial standard, which should be as sacred to us as the sanctity of our homes."

== Later life and death ==
Bellamy is known to have spent 19 years working in New York City but it is unclear as to when. While living there he would work in the advertising industry. He believed in high pressure advertising and thought that it could also still be truthful at the same time. Advertising was seen by him as a way to create demand for American industrial activities.

Bellamy and his second wife, Marie, moved from New York City to Tampa, Florida in 1922 where he spent the remainder of his life. Starting in 1926 he began to work part time for the Tampa Electric Company as advertising manager after persuading the company's management that they needed systemic publicity/advertising he could develop. The 1930 United States Census recorded him residing at 2926 Wallcraft Avenue. He got fired from his job at Tampa Electric Company on July 15, 1931, and applied for and got a similar job at Tampa Gas Company.

Bellamy died in Tampa on August 28, 1931, at the age of 76. His cremated remains were brought back to New York and buried in a family plot in a cemetery in Rome, New York.

== Personal life ==
Bellamy married Harriet Benton in Newark, New York, in 1881. They had three sons: John, who lived in California; David, who lived in Rochester, New York; and Brewster, who died as an infant. His first wife died in 1918, and he married Marie Morin (1920). His daughter-in-law Rachael (David's wife) lived in Rochester until February/March 1989 when she died at the age of 93. David and Rachael had two children, David Jr. and Peter (1929-2021). His son, John Benton Bellamy, married Ruth "Polly" (née Edwards). They had three children, Harriet (1911–1999), Barbara (1913–2005) and John Benton Bellamy, Jr. (1921–2015).

Bellamy was the cousin of Edward Bellamy, most famous for the utopian novel Looking Backward, which inspired the formation of Nationalist Clubs that similarly advocated a certain kind of Christian Socialism.
