= Dr. Heidenhoff's Process =

1880 novel by Edward Bellamy

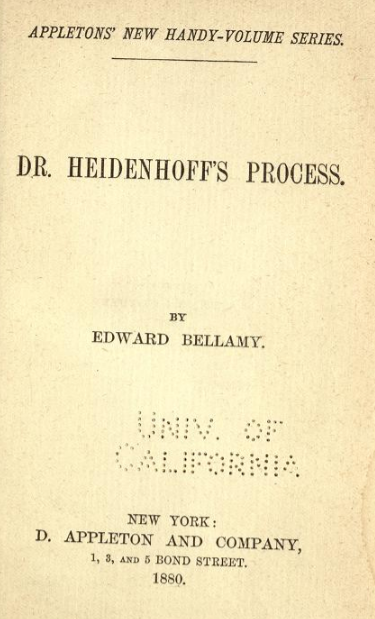
- Title page for Dr. Heidenhoff's Process (1880)
- Author: Edward Bellamy
- Language: English
- Genre: Fantasy novel
- Publisher: D. Appleton & Company
- Publication date: 1880
- Publication place: United States
- Media type: Print (hardback)
- Pages: 140 pp

Dr. Heidenhoff's Process is an early novel by American author Edward Bellamy. The book was first published by D. Appleton & Company in 1880.

== Plot introduction ==
The novel concerns a doctor who develops a mechanical method of eradicating painful memories from people's brains so that they can feel good about life again. The protagonist persuades his lover to try the process after she has been seduced by a rival. She is transformed until the protagonist awakes and realizes that he has dreamt of the doctor and his process and that his lover has committed suicide.
