= To Whom This May Come =

1889 short story by Edward Bellamy

- Short story by Edward Bellamy
- Country: United States
- Language: English

Publication
- Publication date: February 1889
- Pages: 14 pp

To Whom This May Come is an 1889 short story by American author Edward Bellamy. The story was first published in the February 1889 issue of Harper's New Monthly Magazine.

== Plot ==
The themes of the story are telepathy and utopian society. The narrator travels on a ship that breaks apart leaving him as the sole survivor. He is stranded on a remote island inhabited by a people with the ability to read minds. This special skill, which has evolved, has alleviated many of the fears and anxieties that afflict modern life in the rest of the world, such as lies, crimes, and problems with relationships. The narrator eventually is rescued and returns to the U.S. where he reveals his experiences.
