= Monument to credit card =

Coordinates: 56.83399°N 60.59766°E

The monument to a credit card was opened on August 5, 2011 in Yekaterinburg, Russia. The monument was erected on the corner of Bankovski alley and Malyshev street and is a bas-relief of a hand that holds a credit card, embedded into the side of a building. The size of the monument is about two metres high and one metre wide. Based upon Google Maps imagery, it was removed between August 2015 and October 2016

The creation of the monument was made under the initiative of the Vuz-Bank, which in 2011 celebrated the 20th anniversary of its founding. The idea was embodied by Yekaterinburg's sculptor Sergei Belyaev. The name engraved on the monument is that of Edward Bellamy, the science fiction writer who in his novel "Looking Backward" in 1888 first proposed the idea of payment cards.
