= Philalethes Society =

The Philalethes Society is a Masonic research society based in North America. The society was founded on October 1, 1928, by a group of Masonic authors led by Cyrus Field Willard. Willard was a former reporter for the Boston Globe and the founder of a utopian commune on Puget Sound. Philalethes was designed to serve the needs of those in search of deeper insight into the history, rituals and symbolism of Freemasonry.

== Publications ==
In the Society's early days, all of its publications appeared in other, established Masonic periodicals—many of which were edited by Fellows of the Society. There was no separate Philalethes journal. Soon, the hardships of the Great Depression and World War II caused nearly all Masonic periodicals to cease publication. After the war ended, and paper rationing was lifted, the Philalethes Society was able to release the first issue of Philalethes. The first issue, dated March, 1946, was edited by Walter A. Quincke.

Philalethes: The Review of Masonic Research and Letters has long served as the unofficial magazine for North American Freemasonry. The journal features original research, Masonic education articles, book reviews, art and poetry by new and established Masonic writers. At the present time, the journal is published quarterly.

== Origin of the name ==
The Greek word φιλαλήθης (pronounced "fill-a-LAY-thayss") was used by ancient writers such as Aristotle and Plutarch, and means "a lover of truth." One of the early uses of the word was as part of a nom de plume of Eirenaeus Philalethes (the peaceful lover of truth) who was a 17th-century alchemist and the author of many influential works. The word came into Masonic circles through alchemical mystic Robert Samber (1682–1745), who used the pseudonym Eugenius Philalethes; Samber's use, in turn, was an homage to Thomas Vaughan, an earlier alchemist who had used the same name. Finally, a Rite of Philaléthes was founded in Paris in 1772, devoted to the study of esotericism. Founding President Cyrus Field Willard wrote in 1936 that the Philalethes Society took its name from the Parisian Philaléthes.

== Membership ==
Originally the Philalethes Society consisted only of recognized Masonic authors, limited to forty Fellows at any given time in imitation of the Académie Française. Access was opened to all regular Master Masons through the Correspondence Circle. Today, members of the Correspondence Circle are merely referred to as "Members." The number of Fellows is still restricted to forty.

Among the original forty Fellows were Cyrus Field Willard, Harold V. B. Voorhis, Rudyard Kipling, Oswald Wirth, Robert I. Clegg, Henry F. Evans, Louis Block, J. Hugo Tatsch, Charles S. Plumb, Harry L. Haywood, J.S.M. Ward, and Charles C. Hunt.

Fellows elected since that time have included Masonic notables such as Carl H. Claudy (1936), Arthur Edward Waite (1937), Ray Denslow (1945), Allen E. Roberts (1963), S. Brent Morris (1980), John Mauk Hilliard (1981), Wallace McLeod (1986), Thomas W. Jackson (1991), Norman Vincent Peale (1991), Robert G. Davis (1993), Leon Zeldis (1994), Michael R. Poll (2003) and Jay Kinney (2010).
