= Sylvester Baxter =

American journalist and urban planner (1850–1927)

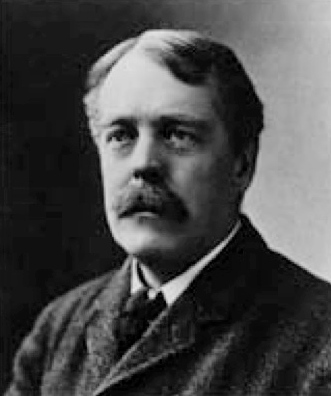
Sylvester Baxter in 1893; photo by Elmer Chickering

Sylvester Baxter (February 6, 1850–1927) was an American newspaper writer, poet, and urban planner in the Boston area. In 1893 he became the first secretary of the Massachusetts Metropolitan Park Commission and along with Charles Eliot was a chief force in the development of the Metropolitan Park System of Greater Boston.

== Biography ==
=== Early years ===
Born in West Yarmouth, Massachusetts, Baxter attended universities in Leipzig and Berlin in the 1870s before returning to Boston and becoming a writer for the Boston Herald. Baxter continued urban planning efforts into the 20th century. He also wrote for the Boston Evening Transcript, wrote poetry and published magazine essays.

=== Political activity ===
In 1889 Baxter was one of the founders of the First Nationalist Club of Boston and was active in the political movement which attempted to steer economic and social change in accordance with the vision of novelist Edward Bellamy in his 1888 novel, Looking Backward: 2000-1887.

Baxter was the secretary of the Metropolitan Improvement Commission of Boston, and was greatly interested in transportation issues, including in particular the urban trolley system.

=== Travel to Mexico: Spanish-Colonial Architecture in Mexico ===
Between 1920 and 1926 he traveled to Mexico. He wrote Spanish-Colonial Architecture in Mexico (La arquitectura hispano-colonial de México, in Spanish), a documentary registry of Colonial art and a critique to Colonial architecture in Mexico of the 16th, 17th and 18th centuries. The translation into Spanish was published in 1934, including images by Henry Greenwood Peabody which were later part of the collection of images donated by Fondo Guillermo Tovar de Teresa to the Instituto Nacional de Antropología e Historia.

=== Death and legacy ===
Baxter died in 1927 in San Juan, Puerto Rico. He is the namesake of Sylvester Baxter Riverfront Park in Somerville, Massachusetts, a suburb of Boston.

In 1956, the Malden Garden Club dedicated the Sylvester Baxter Delta in Malden. This was reported on page one in the May 15, 1956 issue of the Malden Evening News. The Sylvester Baxter Delta is located at 42°25'48.5"N 71°05'04.8"W, in Malden, Massachusetts where Savin Street and Fellsmere Road meet. The memorial plaque was rediscovered by two Malden residents in October 2015.

== Works ==
- The Morse Collection of Japanese Pottery. Salem, MA: Essex Institute, 1887.
- The Old New World: An Account of the Explorations of the Hemenway Southwestern Archæological Expedition in 1887-88, under the Direction of Frank Hamilton Cushing. Salem, MA: Salem Press, 1888.
- "Why the Name, Nationalism?" The Nationalist [Boston], vol. 1, no. 3 (July 1889), pp. 82–83.
- The Cruise of a Land-Yacht. Boston, MA: The Authors' Mutual Publishing Co., 1891.
- Significant Comparisons of the Cost of Light Furnished under Municipal Ownership with that by Private Corporations. Providence, RI: E.A. Johnson & Co., 1891.
- Lynn's Public Forest: A Hand-Book Guide to the Great Woods Park in the City of Lynn. Boston, Author's Mutual Publishing Company. 1891.
- The Metropolitan Park System. Boston, MA: Massachusetts Horticultural Society. 1894.
- Boston Park Guide: Including the Municipal and Metropolitan Systems of Greater Boston. Boston: Sylvester Baxter, 1895.
- Spanish-Colonial Architecture in Mexico. Boston, MA: J.B. Millet, 1901.
- The Hotel Cluny of a New England Village. Salem, MA: Salem Press Co., 1901.
- The Legend of the Holy Grail as Set Forth in the Frieze Painted by Edwin A. Abbey for the Boston Public Library. Boston, MA: Curtis & Cameron, 1904.
- Golden New England. Boston, MA: N.W. Harris & Company, 1910.
- Remaking a Railway: A Study in Efficiency, Being an Appreciation of the New Transportation Epoch in New England. Boston, New England Lines, n.d. [1910].
- Salvation by Trolley: Trolley Lines as Feeders for Railways Mean Prosperity for Rural Communities. Boston, MA: Rand Avery Supply Co., n.d. [1911].
- Should Railroads Own Trolleys? A Study of the Conditions Involved in the Proposed Consolidation of the Springfield and Worcester Trolley Systems with the Railroad-Owned Berkshire System. Boston, MA: W.S. Best Printing Co., n.d. [1912].
- Helping New England Grow: Organized Efforts of the Railroads: The New England Lines Industrial Bureau; Its Constructive Activities. Boston, MA: n.p., 1913.
- The Unseen House, and Other Poems. Boston, MA: Four Seas, 1917.
- The Ring and the Tree and Other Poems. Boston, MA: B. Humphries, 1938.
- The Southwest in the American imagination : the writings of Sylvester Baxter, 1881-1889. Curtis M Hinsley and David R Wilcox (eds.) Tucson, AZ: University of Arizona Press, 1996.
