= Lydia Kingsmill Commander =

Canadian-born journalist, minister, and activist

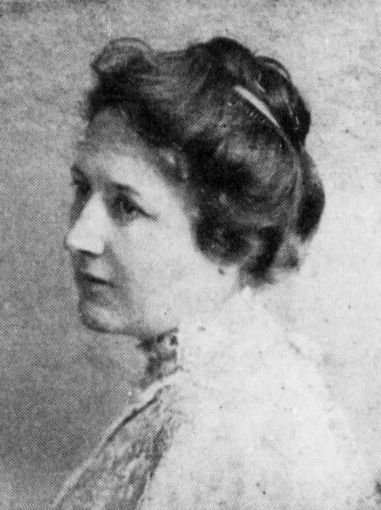
Lydia Kingsmill Commander circa 1904

Lydia Kingsmill Commander (October 18, 1869 – October 17, 1940) was a Canadian-born journalist, minister, and activist who worked mainly in the United States. Trained as a minister, she led a church in Wisconsin before moving to the Ruskin Colony. She then came to New York City, where she edited several magazines and was involved in the suffrage movement. Her book The American Idea (1907) argued that American families should have many more children in order to combat malign influences on the population.

== Early life and education ==
Lydia Kingsmill Commander was born on October 18, 1869, in Clinton, Ontario, to Lydia (Kingsmill) and Charles Richard Commander. She attended a collegiate institute in Stratford, Ontario, the University of Western Ontario, and Meadville Theological School (now Meadville Lombard Theological School) in Meadville, Pennsylvania. According to a 1907 profile, she "spent most of her girlhood in Toledo, Ohio", and lived in Detroit, Michigan, for a time.

== Career ==
As of 1897, Commander was pastor of a Congregational church in Baraboo, Wisconsin. She left that position to become a member of the Ruskin Colony.

At the colony, she met Herbert Newton Casson, who became her husband. They were married in two ceremonies: first on March 5, 1899, and second on May 4, 1899. After the second marriage ceremony, they told the press that Lydia would not take Herbert's name — a decision regarded as unusual at the time. She and Casson likely separated around 1915.

After her marriage, Commander moved to New York with Casson. As a journalist, Commander edited the New York Journal, Bellamy Review, and Fair Play. As an activist, she lectured for the New York Humane Society and co-founded the Women's Political Union, a militant suffragist group. As of 1908, she chaired the Women's League of New York state.

Elaine Tyler May describes Commander as a "feminist, trade unionist, and peace activist".

Commander died near London, England, in late 1940.

== Publications ==
In 1903, Peter Eckler of New York published Commander's short story titled "Marred in the Making". According to a review in The Arena by B. O. Flower, "Marred" is about "[a] lust-begotten child, the fruit of low animal gratification on the part of the father. It came undesired even by the mother, and its life emphasized in a tragic way the result of an existence cursed by a father's lust and a mother's loathing even before it saw the light of day."

Commander's book The American Idea: Does the National Tendency Toward a Small Family Point to Race Suicide or Race Degeneration?, published by Alfred Smith Barnes's company in 1907, argued that American families should have six children so that the population would not be composed of "soldiers, imbeciles, and cripples, three classes with which we might well dispense". The American Idea was dedicated to Theodore Roosevelt, whom it credited with the first recognition of the "race suicide" problem in the United States.

According to The American Idea, "the American race" was "disappearing" because Americans did not have enough children. The book was part of a trend in American writing around the turn of the 20th century in which advocates argued that the "American race" should be preserved against malign influences and that the United States was risking "race suicide" through increased immigration. In addition to its arguments about population, The American Idea argued that the divorce rate would be reduced if Americans adopted what Commander called a "marriage of equality", which she distinguished from a "tribal marriage".
