= Edward Bellamy House =

Historic house in Massachusetts, United States

- U.S. National Register of Historic Places
- U.S. National Historic Landmark
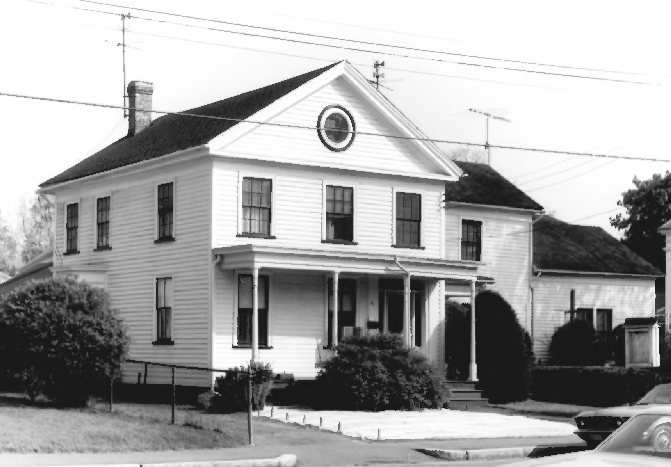
- 1971 National Park Service photo

- Location within Massachusetts Location within the United States
- Location: 91–93 Church Street, Chicopee, Massachusetts
- Coordinates: 42°9′21″N 72°35′4″W
- Built: 1852
- Website: edwardbellamyhouse.org
- NRHP reference No.: 71000091

Significant dates
- Added to NRHP: November 11, 1971
- Designated NHL: November 11, 1971

The Edward Bellamy House is a National Historic Landmark at 91–93 Church Street in the Chicopee Falls section of the city of Chicopee, Massachusetts, United States. Its landmark designation was in honor of journalist and Utopian writer Edward Bellamy (1850–1898), whose home it was for most of his life.

Built in 1852, Bellamy's father moved the family into the house after its construction. Bellamy grew up in the house, and returned there after completing his studies and a brief stint of work in New York City. He did much of his writing (both journalistic and otherwise) in his father's study until the latter's death in 1886, after which Bellamy's family took over the entire house. It was in these years that Bellamy wrote Looking Backward, the work that brought him fame. His principal absences from Chicopee were made in a quest to improve his tubercular health, which eventually claimed his life.

The property had only two private owners after the Bellamys before it was acquired in the 1970s by the Edward Bellamy Memorial Association and restored. The association operates part of the property as a historic house museum, and rents out office space in the remainder. The building is not architecturally distinguished, and has undergone a variety of alterations.

== Architecture ==
The main part of the house is two stories high, with a gable end facing the street. It is three window bays wide, with the front door occupying the righthand bay. A single story porch extends across the width of this part of the house. The pediment of the street-facing gable end has a small circular window in it.

The house has three additions. A single story addition extends from the rear of the house, and a two-story addition extends to the main house's right, with its roof gable perpendicular to that of the main house. A single story ell extends further to the right from the second addition. The main house is numbered 91 Church Street, while a separate entrance from the second addition is numbered 93.

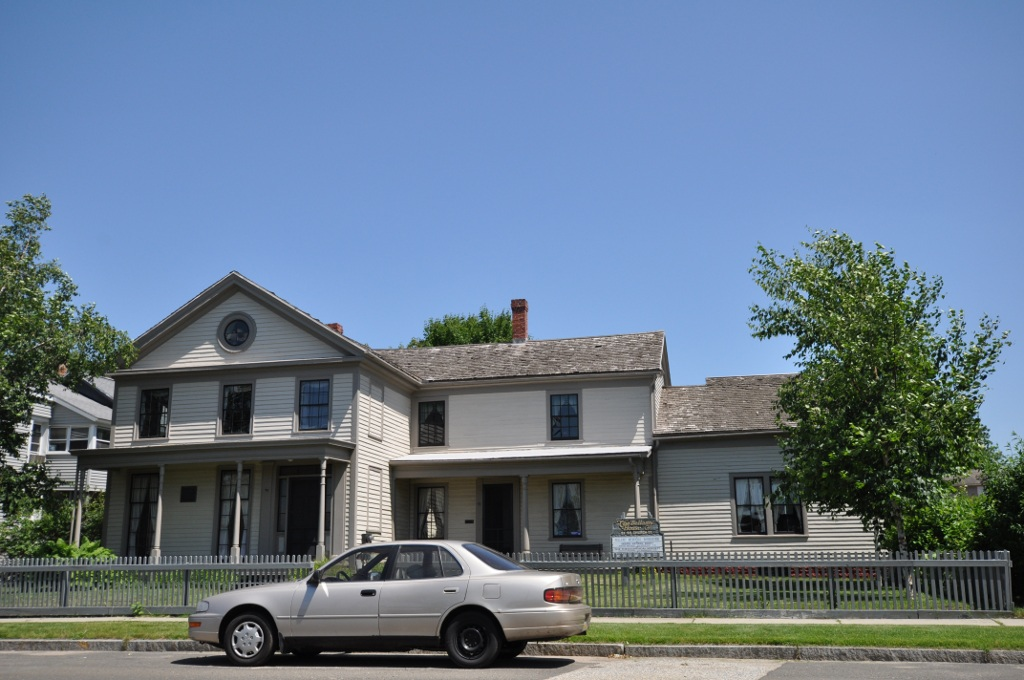
Bellamy House, 2013

Inside the main house, a stairway leads up from the front entry, with a parlor occupying the space to the left. The dining room is behind the parlor, with the kitchen occupying the first addition. The parlor and dining room have matching fireplaces with black marble mantels. The upstairs of the main house has three bedrooms, one of which has a builtin desk and bookcases, and may have been used as a study.

The two story addition and the ell to its right effectively form a second dwelling space. Accessible via an outside entrance and a door in the main house's entry hall, this space has seen multiple uses over the course of the house's history.

== History ==
The house was built in 1852. Rufus and Maria Bellamy moved there from a nearby house when their son Edward was still a baby. Rufus Bellamy was the local Baptist minister, whose church was also nearby. The house was sited near a high point in Chicopee, and would have had views of the growing mill centers of Chicopee Falls and Cabotville. The neighborhood was then one of the wealthier in the town (Chicopee was not incorporated as a city until 1891), where the owners and managers of the local factories lived. Edward Bellamy likened his wealthy neighbors to "the feudal baron dwelling among the people".

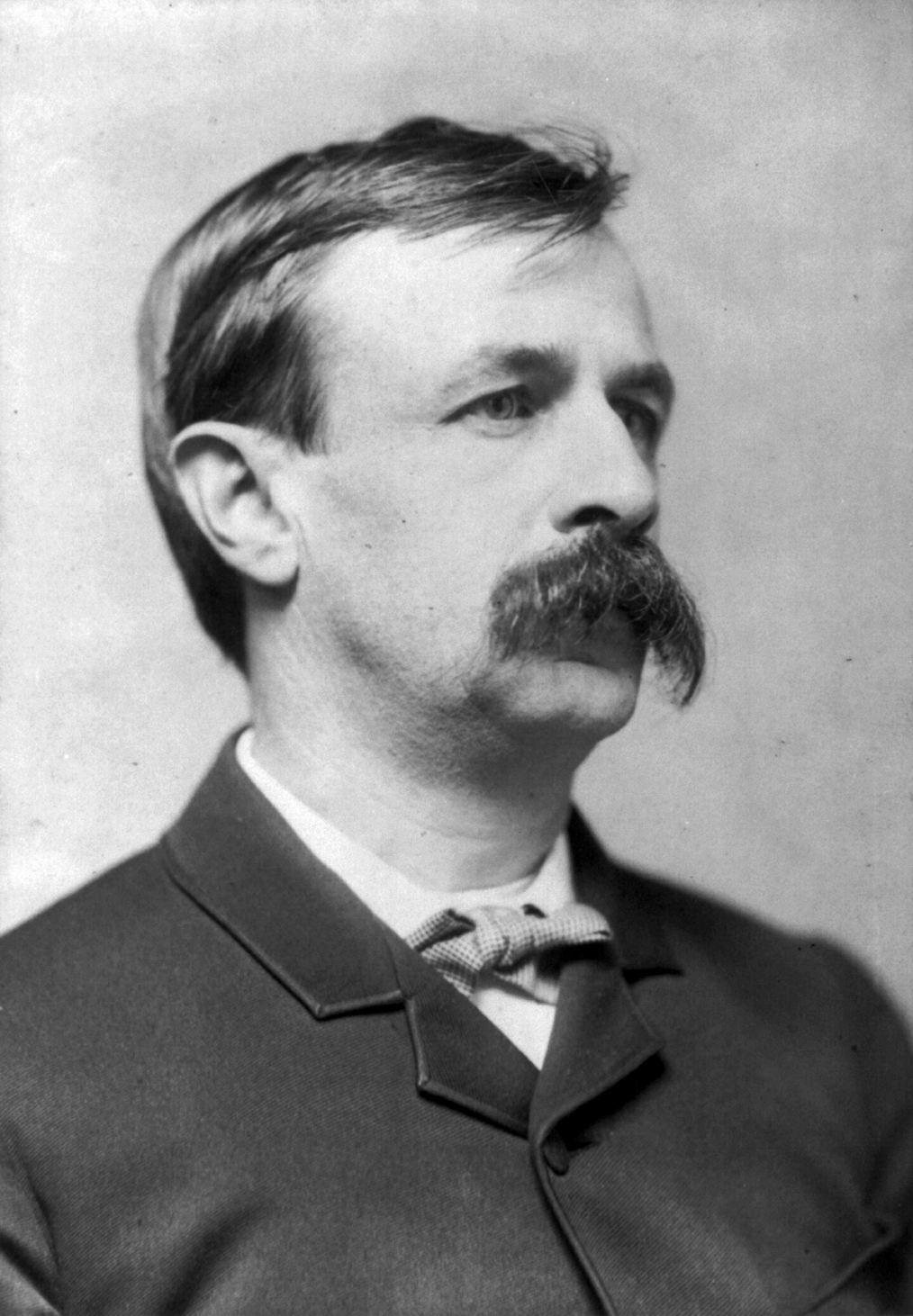
Edward Bellamy, c. 1889

Edward Bellamy was the third of four children. In 1867 he attended Union College in Schenectady, New York, and from 1868 to 1869 he lived in Germany with a cousin. From 1871 to 1872 he worked for a time in New York City as a journalist.

From 1872 to the end of his life, Bellamy, with three exceptions, made the house his home. In 1876, in a quest to improve his health (he suffered from tuberculosis, which would eventually kill him), he went on an extended tour to the Sandwich Islands (now Hawaii). In 1882 he married Emma Sanderson, a ward of his father's since 1874. When the couple were expecting their second child, they lived in the house next door for a time in 1886. Rufus Bellamy died in November 1886, and Edward and his family promptly moved back in. In 1887 he published Looking Backward, a utopian novel that was instantly popular, and brought Bellamy wide notice. In 1895 Bellamy traveled to Denver, Colorado in another bid to improve his failing health. After unsuccessful attempts at treatment, he returned to Chicopee in April 1896, and died at home one month later.

According to a neighbor, Bellamy at first used his father's study for his writing. In his later years Bellamy would also use other areas of the house for his work, leaving chaotic piles of manuscript paper lying about. When Bellamy helped found the Penny News (later the Springfield Daily News), it began publication in the house.

The house remained in the family until 1905, when Emma Bellamy sold it to a photographer named Hanniman. He divided the house, using the right-hand side as a professional space. Hanniman was also responsible for enlarging the fourth addition, and replacing a barn on the property with a garage. In 1965 the house was sold to Joseph Lavallee, whose only significant alteration was to update the kitchen.

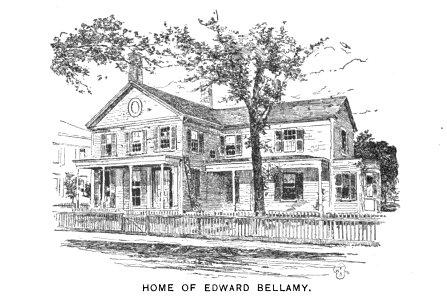
Drawing of Bellamy's house, published in 1902

The house was added to the National Register of Historic Places and designated a National Historic Landmark in 1971.

The Edward Bellamy Memorial Association purchased the property in 1974, and conducted major restoration efforts in the 1970s and 1980s, assisted by the Society for the Preservation of New England Antiquities (now Historic New England). The association operates part of the house as a museum, renting out the other to provide additional income.

== Bellamy and Chicopee ==
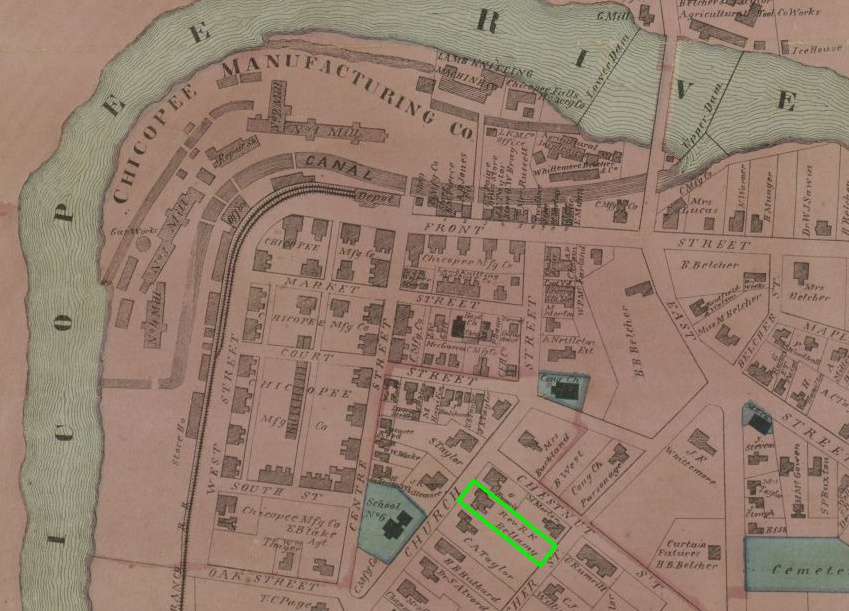
An 1870 map of Chicopee Falls; Bellamy's property is outlined in green

Despite Bellamy's lifelong association with Chicopee, he was a detached observer of the social changes unfolding in the growing industrial areas of the town. He was a somewhat reclusive personality who shunned publicity, avoiding social and speaking engagements, including in the years of his popularity following the publication of Looking Backward. He was not widely known within the town. When it was suggested that Bellamy move to Boston to facilitate the production of the journal A New Nation (begun to support and promote the social and political movements established in the wake of the publication of Looking Backward), Bellamy demurred, writing "I have the deepest aversion to change."

Bellamy did, however, draw on the community for inspiration in his writings. The last name of Julian West, the protagonist of Looking Backward, is that of one of his neighbors. Elements of his historical novel The Duke of Stockbridge, based on the events of the 1786–87 Shays' Rebellion, are set in a town resembling Chicopee, and characters in his short story "A Nantucket Idyll" are based on local women. Biographer Arthur Morgan notes that many of his other stories are set in towns based "quite obviously [on] the village of Chicopee Falls".

== See also ==
- National Register of Historic Places listings in Hampden County, Massachusetts
- List of National Historic Landmarks in Massachusetts
