= Joseph R. Conlin =

American historian and academic

- Born: January 7, 1940 (age 86); Philadelphia, Pennsylvania, U.S.
- Occupation: Historian
- Years active: 1967–present
- Employer: California State University, Chico

Joseph R. Conlin (born January 7, 1940) is an American historian and academic who in 1995 retired amid controversy from his duties as professor of American history at California State University at Chico.

== Biography ==
Conlin was born in Philadelphia where he attended public and parochial suburban schools and was educated at Villanova University (BA, 1961) and the University of Wisconsin (MA, 1962, PhD 1966).

He has taught American history at several colleges and universities, mostly at California State University, Chico. He was a Fulbright Professor in Rome and Salzburg and was twice Visiting Senior Lecturer at the Social History Centre at Warwick University, England. For nearly three decades, he taught one to four sections of United States history per term. He retired in 1995 after winning four awards for excellence in teaching.

== Works ==
Conlin has written more than 10 books, nearly 70 articles in scholarly journals and magazines of popular history, nearly 100 book reviews, and miscellanea for numerous newspapers. Several of his essays and one book received awards for "best of the year" from professional associations.

The University of Washington's Labor Press Project wrote:

Joseph R. Conlin's compilation, The American Radical Press, 1880-1960, remains an important source for radical newspapers... Joseph Conlin's discussion of the Socialist Party Monthly Bulletin (1904-1913) and The Party Builder (1912-1914), argues that these internal newsletters should be consulted in any study of the Socialist Party because they provide administrative data and statistics instead of propaganda, but he cautions that consulting these newsletters alone would create a distorted picture of the Socialist party.

(All works cited below come from the Library of Congress catalog.)

=== Books ===
- American anti-war movements (1968)
- Big Bill Haywood and the Radical Union Movement (1969)
- Bread and Roses Too: Studies of the Wobblies (1969)
- The Troubles: A Jaundiced Glance Back at the Movement of the Sixties (1982)
- American Past: A Survey of American History (1984)
- Our Land, Our Time: A History of the United States (1985)
- Bacon, Beans, and Galantines: Food and Foodways on the Western Mining Frontier (1986)
- Our Land, Our Time: A History of the United States from 1865 (1986)
- Our Land, Our Time: A History of the United States to 1877 (1986)
- Our Land, Our Time: A History of the United States: Primary Sources (1986)
- American Past: A Survey of American History (1987)
- American Past: A Survey of American History (1990)
- Our Land, Our Time: A History of the United States (1991)
- American Past: A Survey of American History (1991)
- American Past: A Survey of American History (1993)
- American Past: A Survey of American History (1997)
- American Past: A Survey of American History (2001)
- American Past: A Survey of American History (2004)
- American Past: A Survey of American History (2007)
- American Past: A Survey of American History (2009)
- American Past: A Survey of American History (2012)

=== Edited books ===
- American Radical Press, 1880-1960, edited with an introduction (1974)
- At the Point of Production: The Local History of the IWW (1981)
- American Harvest: Readings in American History (with C. H. Peterson (1986)

=== Compilations ===
- The Morrow Book of Quotations in American History (1984)
