= Equality (novel) =

1897 novel by Edward Bellamy

- Author: Edward Bellamy
- Language: English
- Genre: Utopian novel Science fiction
- Publisher: D. Appleton & Company
- Publication date: 1897
- Publication place: United States
- Media type: Print (hardback)
- Pages: xii, 412 pp
- Preceded by: Looking Backward

Equality is a utopian novel by Edward Bellamy, and the sequel to Looking Backward: 2000–1887. It was first published in 1897. The book contains a minimal amount of plot; Bellamy primarily used Equality to expand on the theories he first explored in Looking Backward.

The text is now in the public domain and available for free.

== Synopsis ==
The story takes up immediately after the events of Looking Backward with the main characters from the first novel, Julian West, Doctor Leete, and his daughter Edith.

West tells his nightmare of return to the 19th century to Edith, who is sympathetic. West's citizenship in the new America is recognized, and he goes to the bank to obtain his own account, or "credit card," from which he can draw his equal share of the national product. He learns that Edith and her mother do not normally wear the long skirts he has seen them in (they had been wearing them so as not to offend his 19th century sensibilities): when Julian tells Edith that he would not be shocked to see them dressed in the modern fashion, Edith immediately runs into the house and comes out dressed in a pants suit. Clothing has revolutionised and is now made of strengthened paper, recycled when dirty, and replaced at very little cost (shoes and dishes are made of variations on the same substance).

Julian learns that women are free to compete in many of the same trades as men; the manager of the paper factory he visits with Edith is a woman. Edith herself is in the second year of the three year general labor period required of everyone before choosing a trade, but has taken leave to spend time with Julian. The two tour a tenement house, in which no one now lives, kept as a reminder of the evils of private capitalism.

Julian opens his safe (a device unknown in 2000 outside museums). Dr. Leete sees his mortgages and securities not as long-obsolete claims to ownership interest in things, but rather in people and their labor. The papers are worthless except as antiques, as most papers of the sort were burned at the conclusion of the economic transition, in a great blaze on the former site of the New York Stock Exchange. The gold coins in the safe are admired for their prettiness, but are also worthless.

Julian learns more about the world of the year 2000. Handwriting has been virtually replaced by phonograph records, and jewelry is no longer used, since jewels are now worthless. Julian is amazed by a television-like device, called the electroscope. World communication is simplified, since everyone now speaks a universal language in addition to their native tongue. Not only are there motor cars, but also private air cars. Everyone is now vegetarian, and the thought of eating meat is looked upon with revulsion.

The book concludes with an almost uninterrupted series of lectures from Dr. Leete and other characters, mostly concerning how the idyllic state in which West has arrived was achieved.

== Reaction ==
As might be expected given the success of Looking Backward, Equality was highly anticipated. A large first edition was ordered by the publishers. In spite of this, the first edition entirely sold out within 36 hours of publication.

Ripley Hitchcock, who was affiliated with Bellamy's publishers, explained the thematic distinction between Looking Backward and Equality as the latter "explain[s] not only [the institutions of Bellamy's future's] righteousness and reason, but likewise the course of historical evolution by which they were born out of the very different order of things existing to-day".

Reaction to Equality was generally not good. Nicholas P. Gilman provides a common criticism for the work in his review for the Quarterly Journal of Economics. Written in 1897, Gilman explains, "Mr. Bellamy has apparently abandoned fiction, and has at length broken the silence of several years with a volume which is neither novel nor a treatise on socialism in scientific form, but a prolonged reduplication of the monologues of Dr. Leete, the part of Looking Backward which has the least interest for most of its readers".

On the other hand, John Dewey (who called Bellamy "a great American prophet") preferred Equality, considering it to be "more populist and democratic" than the "more popular and authoritarian" Looking Backward. Peter Kropotkin also received the book more favorably, arguing that it was superior to Looking Backward because Bellamy had removed the authoritarian aspects. Kropotkin claimed that these elements did not fit the character of the former work in any case, and stated that he believed that if someone suitable could have conversed with Bellamy, they could have convinced him to declare for anarchism.
