= Nationalist Clubs =

Organized American network of socialist political groups (1888–1896)

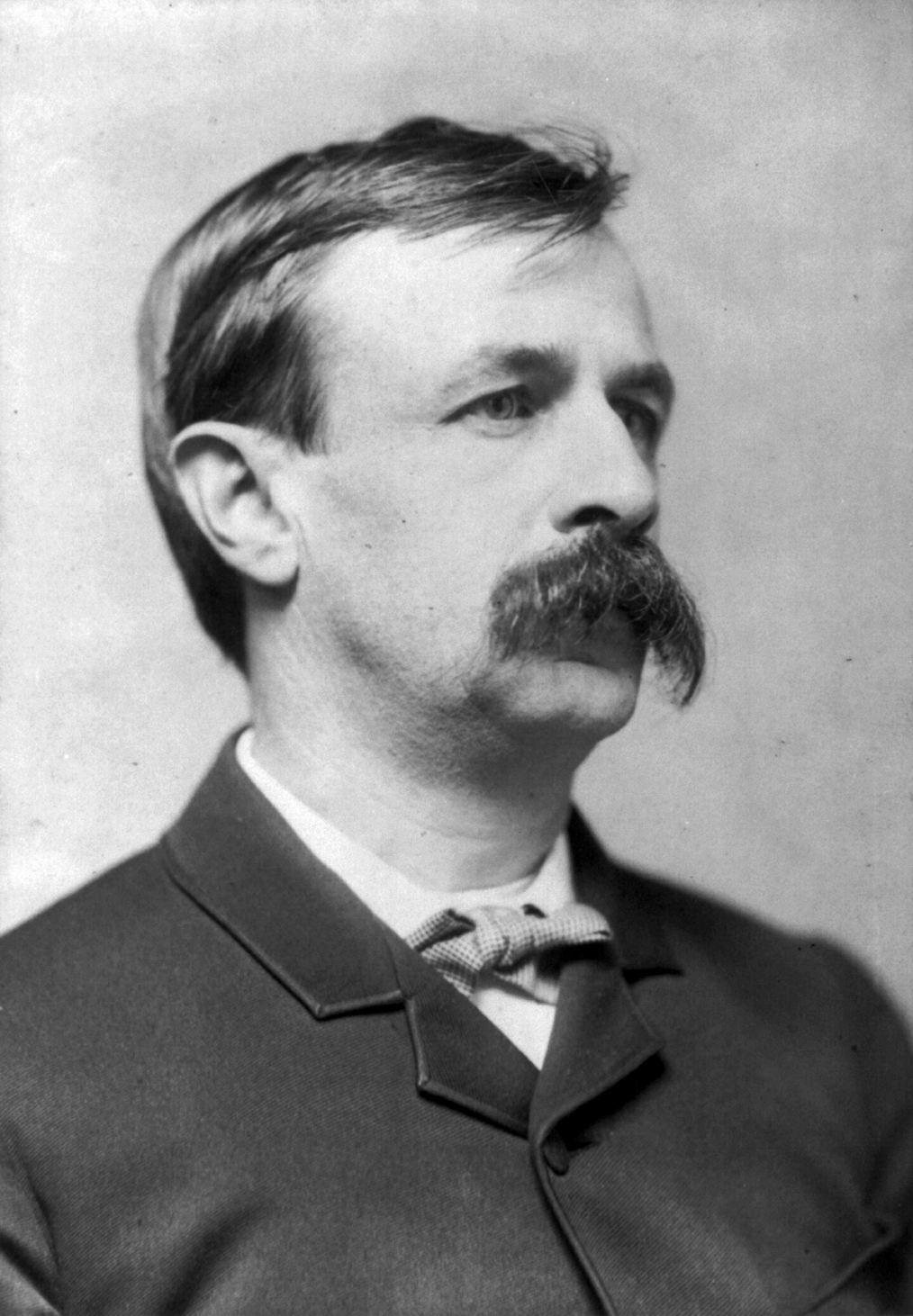
Edward Bellamy, whose utopian writings were the inspiration for the Nationalist Clubs of 1888 to 1896

Nationalist Clubs were an organized network of socialist political groups which emerged at the end of the 1880s in the United States in an effort to make real the ideas advanced by Edward Bellamy in his utopian novel Looking Backward. At least 165 Nationalist Clubs were formed by so-called "Bellamyites," who sought to remake the economy and society through the nationalization of industry. One of the last issues of The Nationalist noted that "over 500" had been formed. Owing to the growth of the Populist movement and the financial and physical difficulties suffered by Bellamy, the Bellamyite Nationalist Clubs began to dissipate in 1892, lost their national magazine in 1894, and vanished from the U.S. political scene entirely circa 1896. However the movement had an impact by causing other socialist parties to be started in the U.S. and had an impact on politics in other countries even after 1896.

== Organizational history ==
=== Background ===
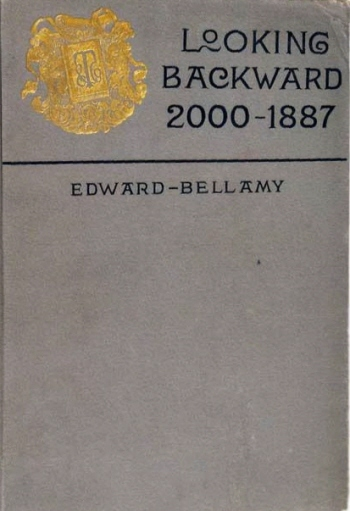
Cover of Edward Bellamy's utopian novel, Looking Backward, 2000-1887

In 1888, a young Massachusetts writer named Edward Bellamy published a work of utopian fiction entitled Looking Backward, 2000-1887, telling the Rip Van Winkle-like tale of a 19th-century New England capitalist who awoke from a trace-slumber induced by hypnosis, to find a completely changed society in the then-far-distant year of 2000. In Bellamy's tale, technological advances and a non-violent revolution had transformed the American economy and thereby society; private property had been abolished in favor of state ownership of capital (the means of production and exchange). Men are free from want, and women are equal to men.

Social classes were eliminated and also the ills of society that he thought inevitably followed from them. In the new world in the year 2000, there was no longer war, poverty, crime, prostitution, corruption, money, or taxes. Neither did there exist such occupations seen by Bellamy as of dubious worth to society, such as politicians, lawyers, merchants, or soldiers.

Instead, Bellamy's utopian society of the future was based upon the voluntary employment of all citizens between the ages of 21 and 45, after which time all would retire to pursue self-chosen hobbies. Work was simple and aided by machines, working hours short and vacation time long. The new economy remade human nature itself in Bellamy's idyllic vision, with greed, maliciousness, untruthfulness, and insanity all relegated to the past.

Looking Backward became a massive best-seller of the day. Many U.S. intellectuals enthused about the book's message.

=== Origins (1888) ===
A political movement emerged, dedicated to making Bellamy's utopian vision a practical reality—the so-called "Nationalist Movement." In the summer of 1888. Cyrus Field Willard, a labor reporter for the Boston Globe wrote to Bellamy, asking for his blessings for the establishment of "an association to spread the ideas in your book."

Bellamy responded to Willard's appeal positively, urging him in a July 4 letter:

Go ahead by all means and do it if you can find anyone to associate with. No doubt eventually the formation of such Nationalist Clubs or associations among our sympathizers all over the country will be a proper measure and it is fitting that Boston should lead off in this movement.

Willard founded a small Nationalist discussion group.

Then in early September an entity known as the "Boston Bellamy Club" emerged separately, with Charles E. Bowers and former Civil War General Arthur F. Devereux playing the decisive organizing role. This group issued a public appeal on September 18, 1888. The short document declared there to be "no higher, grander or more patriotic cause for men to enlist in than one for the elevation of their fellow man" and stated that "Edward Bellamy in his great work, Looking Backward, has pointed out the way by which the elevation of man can be attained."

In October 1888 Willard's small Nationalist circle joined forces with the Boston Bellamy Club, establishing the "Nationalist Club" of Boston, "a permanent organization to further the Nationalization of industry." The first regular meeting of the "Nationalist Club" of Boston was held on December 1, 1888, attended by 25 interested participants, with Charles E. Bowers elected chairman. A five-person committee was established to create a plan for a permanent organization, including Boston Herald editorial writer Sylvester Baxter, Willard, Devereux, Bowers, and Christian socialist clergyman W.D.P. Bliss, later editor of the Encyclopedia of Social Reform. Bellamy attended the third meeting of the Boston Nationalist Club, held on December 15, and predictably received a warm welcome.

Boston club members were overwhelmingly of the middle class and included no small number of Theosophists—believers in spiritualism and reincarnation and establishment of the brotherhood of humanity on earth—a popular philosophical trend of the day. Indeed, fully half of the members of the first Nationalist Club were members of the Theosophical Society, including key leaders Willard and Baxter.

The tone of the initial Nationalist movement was philanthropic, intellectual, and elitist, with the Nationalist Clubs structured not as units of a political party—political action was actually prohibited during the group's earliest days—but rather as chapters of an ethical movement. The Boston Nationalist Club held public lectures, and Bellamy himself addressed a meeting held on May 31st, 1889 at Trenton Hall, giving a talk entitled "Plutocracy or Nationalism - Which?" (This talk was published as a pamphlet by the Nationalist Club of Boston.)

In May 1889 he began publishing a monthly magazine called The Nationalist, which attempted to spread Bellamy's ideas to a larger audience through the written word. The Nationalist was simultaneously the bulletin of the Theosophist-dominated Boston Nationalist Club and the official organ of the entire movement. The first editor was Henry Willard Austin, a graduate of Harvard University and attorney who was also a sometimes poet and Theosophist. The magazine never garnered a huge readership, peaking with a paid circulation of 9,000 subscribers, but it was influential in casting the first phase of the Nationalist movement as an ethical propaganda society led by well-known Boston thinkers.

=== Expansion (1889–1890) ===
Jesse Cox, later Chairman of the Social Democratic Party of America, was a leader of the Nationalist Club in Chicago.

Even before the launch of its monthly magazine, the Nationalist Club of Boston found its emulators around the country. In New York City the New York Nationalist Club was launched on Sunday, April 7, 1889, in response to a call issued by recent Socialist Labor Party gubernatorial candidate J. Edward Hall. Although Hall proved too ill with tuberculosis to attend, a number of New York political activists immediately became active in the New York Nationalist Club, including SLP journalists Lucien Sanial and Charles Sotheran as well as Columbia University lecturer Daniel DeLeon. A group of about 100 members immediately emerged from the organizational gathering.

In Chicago the city's Nationalist Club was actually the continuation of an earlier organization known as the "Collectivist League," a group established on April 10, 1888, at a meeting attended by 20 people, including prominent New York socialist author Laurence Gronlund. President of the Chicago Club was a future top official of the Social Democratic Party of America, Jesse Cox, who notably delivered a lecture on the principles of state ownership of industry to a crowd of 1200 people gathered under the League's auspices at a Chicago theater. In February 1889 the Collectivist League changed its name to the Nationalist Club of Illinois and adopted a new declaration of principles, constitution, and by-laws modeled after those of the Boston Nationalist Club. By May 1889 membership in the Chicago Nationalist Club stood at about 50 and the group had begun with the publication of its own pamphlets and the sponsorship of public lectures.

A Nationalist Club was launched in Washington, D.C., on January 31, 1889, and in Hartford, Connecticut, on February 12, 1889. Other clubs sprouted up, in the words of Cyrus Field Willard, "here and there, as if by magic." By 1891 it was reported that no fewer than 162 Nationalist Clubs were in existence. Other Nationalist Clubs were established abroad, including groups in Canada, England, and New Zealand. (In British Columbia, Canada, the movement peaked a few years later than the Nationalist Club movement in the U.S. In BC it elected an MLA and an MP after 1895.)

The Bellamyite movement was a particularly potent in the state of California, which was home to 65 local Nationalist Clubs—about 40% of the organization's total—as well as 5 Nationalist periodicals. By way of contrast, the populous Eastern state of New York was home to just 16 Nationalist Clubs—and other states had fewer.

While the social composition of the Nationalist Clubs was generally dominated by urban professionals, including doctors, lawyers, teachers, journalists, and clergymen motivated by the social gospel, at times these groups drew the participation of an altogether different constituency, including active trade unionists affiliated with the Knights of Labor or the American Federation of Labor. Among those participating were high-ranking AFL functionary P. J. McGuire in Philadelphia and radical activist Burnette G. Haskell in San Francisco.

The various Nationalist Clubs were not centrally directed but instead possessed a certain amount of local autonomy and were linked together loosely through correspondence and co-sponsorship of touring lecturers.

=== Political developments 1890–1892 ===
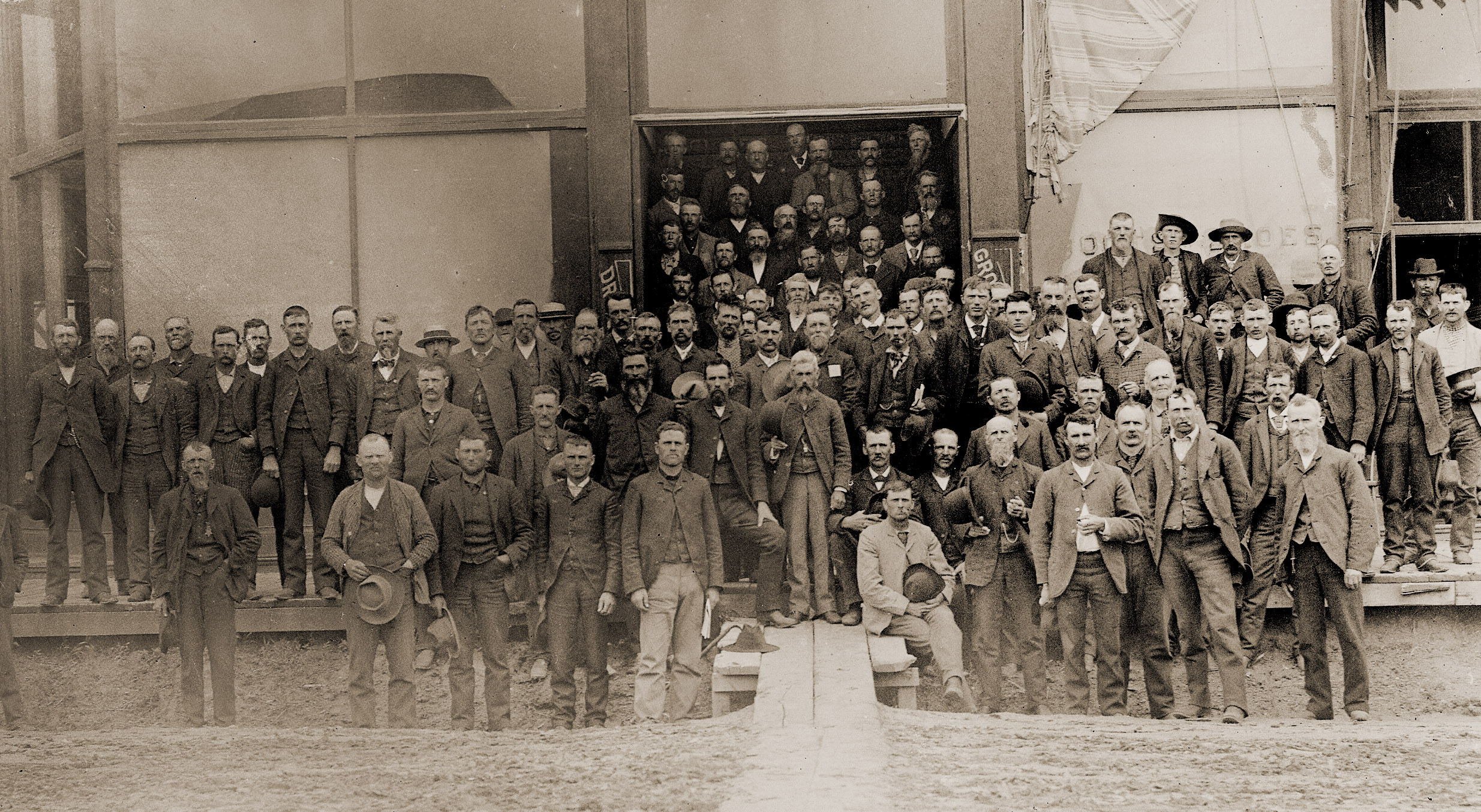
The Nationalist Clubs made common cause with the Midwestern agrarian reformers of the People's Party, shown here in an 1890 convention photo made in Nebraska.

First steps were taken into politics in the fall of 1890, with a Nationalist state ticket put forward in the state of Rhode Island and at least one candidate running for office under the Nationalist Party banner in California (Gaylord Wilshire in California's 6th congressional district).

The possible emergence of a strong Nationalist Party was undercut by the birth of a new political organization in the field, with the People's Party ("Populists") gaining support from a broad segment of American farmers across the Midwest, South, and West. The violent Homestead Strike of 1892 served as a catalyst for oppositional politics in the United States. These events served to politicize not only the Nationalist Clubs but Bellamy himself and he entered the political fray.

With The Nationalist magazine clearly headed for the financial rocks by the end of 1890, Edward Bellamy launched a new monthly magazine of his own in an effort to transform the Nationalist movement from a contemplative propaganda society into a hard-nosed political movement. This new publication was known as The New Nation. Its first issue rolled off the presses on January 31, 1891. Bellamy provided the finances for the new venture and sat as publisher and editor. Mason Green, a veteran journalist who was a graduate of Amherst College joined Bellamy as managing editor, with Henry R. Legate, organizer of the politically oriented Second Nationalist Club of Boston, aiding as assistant editor.

For the next three years the Nationalist movement's earlier largely hands-off approach to the dirty grind of daily politics was replaced by dedicated effort to achieve practical results through immediate political action. The logic of the situation made the upstart reform movement around the Nationalist Clubs the natural ally of the upstart movement emerging around the People's Party, and the two organizations intermingled. Nationalist Club members joined their local People's Party organizations en masse while Bellamy attempted to consolidate this alliance by molding his new publication into one of the most important voices of the Populist movement in the Eastern United States.

Bellamy and the active members of the Nationalist Clubs were strongly supportive of provisions of the People's Party platform which called for the nationalization of the nation's railroads and telegraph system. The Nationalist Clubs remained primarily propaganda organizations even after Bellamy's entry into politics in 1891, although local clubs did occasionally nominate candidates after that date, although most commonly the Nationalists worked in tandem with the People's Party and its candidates.

The move of the Nationalist Clubs and their members from propaganda societies to political entities acting in alliance with the People's Party created a situation whereby the organizations fulfilled duplicate functions, to the detriment of the Bellamy organization. In the assessment of one historian:

By 1892 Populism had sapped the Nationalist movement of any real vigor it still had. The People's Party had a prospect for immediate success entirely lacking in Nationalism. Hundreds of Nationalists joined the Populists, leaving the clubs virtually hollow shells.

=== Decline (1893–1896) ===
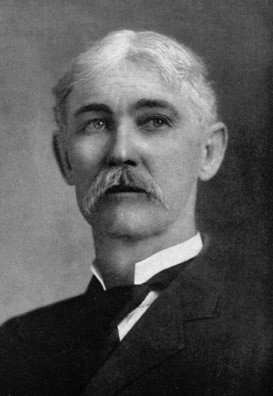
Julius Wayland, publisher of The Coming Nation (later the Appeal to Reason), saw himself as a keeper of the Nationalist and Populist torch.

Bellamy continued to work on behalf of the Nationalist movement through 1894, authoring a document entitled The Programme of the Nationalists, which was published in the intellectual journal The Forum in March of that year. In this document, reprinted by the central publishing house of the Nationalist Clubs based in Philadelphia, Bellamy argued that

Nationalism is economic democracy. It proposes to deliver society from the rule of the rich, and to establish economic equality by the application of the democratic formula to the production and distribution of wealth. It aims to put an end to the present irresponsible control of the economic interests of the country by capitalists pursuing their private ends, and to replace it by responsible public agencies acting for the general welfare.... As political democracy seeks to guarantee men against oppression exercised upon them by political forms, so the economic democracy of Nationalism would guarantee them against the more numerous and grievous oppressions exercised by economic methods.

On February 3, 1894, Bellamy's The New Nation was forced to suspend publication owing to financial difficulties. The publication's top paid circulation in its best year had only reached the 8,000 mark, and even this had proven to be no more than a fond memory by 1894. New periodicals had emerged to pick up the slack, including The Coming Nation, a weekly newspaper published by Julius Augustus Wayland, which proclaimed itself to be an extension of the Bellamyite political tradition. Two years of phantom existence followed, with a handful of pamphlets produced by a Bureau of Nationalist Literature in Philadelphia on behalf of the rapidly waning movement. By 1896 the Bellamyite movement had expired, with all but a small handful of isolated groups vanished forever.

With his health failing from the tuberculosis from which he had suffered since age 25, Bellamy turned once again to literary pursuits. In his last years Bellamy managed a sequel to Looking Backward, entitled Equality which was published just prior to his premature death in 1898. In this final work, Bellamy turned his mind's eye to the question of feminism, dealing with the taboo subject of female reproductive rights in a future, post-revolutionary America. Other subjects overlooked in Looking Backward, such as animal rights and wilderness preservation, were dealt with in a similar context.

As such, Equality has been hailed by historian Franklin Rosemont as "one of the most forward-looking works of nineteenth-century radicalism," and was lauded in its own day by anarchist thinker Peter Kropotkin as "much superior" to Looking Backward for having analyzed "all the vices of the capitalistic system."

== Criticism ==
Bellamy claimed he did not write Looking Backward with a view to creating a blueprint for political action. Asked in 1890 to describe the thought process behind creation of the novel, Bellamy emphasized that he had no particular sympathy with the extant socialist movement, but rather sought to write "a literary fantasy, a fairy tale of social felicity." Bellamy continued that he had "no thought of contriving a house which practical men might live in," but rather attempted to create "a cloud place for an ideal humanity" which was "out of reach of the sordid and material world of the present."

Nevertheless, Bellamy's literary vision was the inspiration of the practical politics of the Nationalist Clubs and has drawn ideological criticism from some contemporary commentators. In the view of historian Arthur Lipow, in his book Bellamy consciously ignored positing democratic control in his idealized structure of the future, instead pinning his hopes upon bureaucratic stratification and quasi-military organization of both economics and social relations. The modern military was seen by Bellamy as a prototype of future society in that it motivated organized and devoted activity in the national interest, Lipow argues With neither material need nor the pursuit of "wanton luxury" to impel action, it was to be this national interest which was seen as the chief motivating factor.

This was, in Lipow's view, a recipe for authoritarianism:

If the workers and the vast majority were a brutish mass, there could be no question of forming a political movement out of them, nor of giving to them the task of creating a socialist society. The new institutions would not be created and shaped from below but would, of necessity, correspond to the plan laid down in advance by the utopian planner.

As such, Lipow argues that Bellamy's vision was technocratic in nature, based upon the mandates of an expert elite rather than individual liberty and freely-decided action.

An early Marxist critique of Bellamyism was supplied by Morris Hillquit, a historian of American socialism and leader in the Socialist Party of America, who noted in 1903:

Bellamy was not familiar with the modern socialist philosophy when he wrote his book. His views and theories were the result of his own observations and reasoning, and, like all other utopians, he evolved a complete social scheme hinging mainly on one fixed idea. In his case it was the idea 'of an industrial army for maintaining the community, precisely as the duty of protecting it is entrusted to a military army'..."

"The historical development of society and the theory of the class struggle, which play so great a part in the philosophy of modern socialism, have no place in Bellamy's system. With him it is all a question of expediency; he is not an exponent of the laws of social development, but a social inventor.

== Publications ==
=== Official magazines ===
- The Nationalist (1889–1891)
  - Vol. 1 (1889) | Vol. 2 (1890) | Vol. 3 (1891)
- The New Nation (1891–1894)
  - Vol. 1 (1891) | Vol. 2 (1892) | Vol. 3 (1893) | Vol. 4 (1894)

=== Books by Edward Bellamy ===
- Looking Backward, 2000-1887. Boston: Houghton, Mifflin Co., 1889.
- Equality. New York: D. Appleton & Co., 1898.

=== Other magazines and pamphlets ===
- Looking Forward, vol. 1, no. 2 (September 1889), National City, California.
- Principles and Purposes of Nationalism: Edward Bellamy's Address at Tremont Temple, Boston, on the Nationalist Club's First Anniversary, December 19, 1889. Philadelphia: Bureau of Nationalist Literature, n.d.
- Edward Bellamy, The Programme of the Nationalists. Philadelphia: Bureau of Nationalist Literature, 1894. —First published in The Forum, March 1894.

=== Anti-Nationalist publications ===
- George A. Sanders, Reality; or, Law and Order vs. Anarchy and Socialism: A Reply to Edward Bellamy's Looking backward and Equality. Cleveland: Burrows Brothers, 1898.

== See also ==
- Georgism

== Sources ==
- Austin, Henry Willard; Cobb, John Storer, eds. (May 1889). "News of the Movement". The Nationalist. 1 (1). Boston, MA, US: Nationalist Educational Association: 23–27. OCLC 643978772 – via Internet Archive.
- Hillquit, Morris (1910) [1906]. "The Socialist Party; I.—Recent Factors of Socialist Growth". History of Socialism in the United States (5th ed.). New York: Funk & Wagnalls Co. pp. 279–294. hdl:2027/hvd.li4a14. OCLC 894629244 – via HathiTrust. Reprinted in 2015: ISBN 9781340018146, 9781330477175
- Jaher, Frederic C. (1974a). "Nationalist: Boston, 1889–1891". In Conlin, Joseph Robert (ed.). The American Radical Press, 1880-1960. Vol. 1. Westport, CT, US: Greenwood Press. pp. 32–35. ISBN 9780837172828. OCLC 804818 – via Internet Archive.
- Jaher, Frederic C. (1974b). "New Nation: Boston, 1891–1894". In Conlin, Joseph Robert (ed.). The American Radical Press, 1880-1960. Vol. 1. Westport, CT, US: Greenwood Press. pp. 36–38. ISBN 9780837172828. OCLC 804818 – via Internet Archive.
- Lipow, Arthur (1982). Authoritarian Socialism in America: Edward Bellamy and the Nationalist Movement. Berkeley: University of California Press. ISBN 9780520040052. OCLC 7272851.
- Quint, Howard H (1964) [1953]. The Forging of American Socialism: Origins of the Modern Movement. Indianapolis, IN, US: Bobbs-Merrill. pp. 82–85, 101–102. OCLC 576299949.
- Rosemont, Franklin (1998) [1990]. "Bellamy, Edward (1850–1898)". In Buhle, Mari Jo; Buhle, Paul; Georgakas, Dan (eds.). Encyclopedia of the American left (2nd ed.). Oxford University Press. pp. 78–82. ISBN 9780195120882. OCLC 651868659 – via Internet Archive.
- Willard, Cyrus Field (May 1889). Austin, Henry Willard; Cobb, John Storer (eds.). "The Nationalist Club of Boston - A Chapter of History". The Nationalist. 1 (1). Boston, MA, US: Nationalist Educational Association: 16–20. OCLC 643978772 – via Internet Archive.
