= William Dwight Porter Bliss =

American Episcopal priest and socialist (1856–1926)

The Reverend William Dwight Porter Bliss
- Born: August 20, 1856; Constantinople, Ottoman Empire
- Died: October 8, 1926 (aged 70); New York City, New York, US
- Education: Amherst College; Hartford Theological Seminary
- Religion: Christianity (Congregationalist · Anglican)
- Church: Episcopal Church (United States)
- Ordained: c. 1882 (Congregationalist); 1886 (Episcopal deacon); 1887 (Episcopal priest)

William Dwight Porter Bliss (1856–1926) was an American Episcopal priest and one of the most famous and influential Christian socialists at the turn of 20th century. As a devout churchman, organizer, public speaker and an editor of numerous publications for over 40 years, Bliss became a central figure for the entire Christian socialist movement.

== Early life ==
William Dwight Porter Bliss was born in Istanbul, Ottoman Empire, on August 20, 1856, the son of Edwin Elisha Bliss and Isabella Holmes (Porter) Bliss. His parents were Christian missionaries at the time. He was educated at Phillips Academy, Andover, Amherst College, and the Hartford Theological Seminary in Hartford, Connecticut.

== Religious and social influences ==
Hartford Theological Seminary was where Bliss first learned about religion in relation to social problems. The most notable influencers during his time of theological study being Henry George and articles in the Christian Union. His immediate work after seminary also greatly impacted the trajectory of his future career as a socialist preacher who engaged in activism. Following his graduation from Hartford Theological Seminary in 1882, Bliss was ordained a Congregationalist minister where he was forced to deal with, first hand, the serious labor problems that faced working-class people in America. After witnessing the effects that working unbearably long hours had on family life, the limited amount of food, and the harsh conditions working-class people faced in Boston, Bliss was convinced that the church had a direct duty to improve such terrible conditions. According to Bliss, every person was a part of the kingdom of God regardless of religion and therefore should be treated as such.

During this same time, Bliss also become interested in the writings of people such as Charles Kingsley, Frederick Denison Maurice, Edward Bellamy, the English Christian socialist, and most notably George E. McNeill. While all these writers were important to Bliss's foundational understanding of Christianity's role in social and economic life, it was George E. McNeill who had the greatest impact. According to Bliss “McNeil was the one man living from whom in spirit as well as economic wisdom he had learned the most”.

These thinkers along with Bliss's experiences helping working-class folk eventually led him to Christian socialism, a movement which sought to apply socialism principles to the teachings of Christ in order to address modern social difficulties, caused, by industrialization and urbanization.

His radical views on Christianity eventually pushed Bliss to leave Congregationalism to join the Episcopal Church on October 25, 1885. On June 16, 1886, he was ordained a deacon in the Episcopal Church, and became a priest on June 8, 1887. He then served at Grace Church in Boston from 1887 until 1890, and finally, he helped organize an inner-city ministry, the Church of the Carpenter, where he served for four years.

== Bliss’s thoughts on Christian Socialism ==
Once Bliss adopted the ideas of Christian Socialism he began to create a very clear distinct understanding of what it meant. While Bliss recognized that the label Christian Socialism on its surface seemed to be a paradox, he believed that "Christianity and socialism were not only compatible, but that socialism was the natural economic expression of christian life." He sought to rid socialism of its philosophical materialism because he believed Christianity was the most effective way to bring socialism to fruition in America. As Bliss mentioned in a speech, his socialist radicalism was grounded not in Marx but in the teachings of Jesus Christ more than anything else. Despite this understanding of Christianity, Bliss originally believed that Christians did not necessarily have to pick a particular political party or organization in order to be genuine socialist. He did argue, however, that if Christians were to truly live according to the Gospel and the words of Jesus, they would intuitively advocate for a socialist society in America. Moreover, the socialist aspect of Christian Socialism for Bliss was not hampered by the word Christian preceding it. He defined socialism as “that mode of social life which, based upon the recognition of the natural brotherhood and unity of mankind would have land and capital owned by the community collectively, and operated cooperatively for the good of all. He was not interested in merely implementing more state intervention or cooperatives. He, like the scientific socialist, believed that in order to create a just society, where the children of God were all treated with dignity and respect, it would require a complete overhaul of the economic system. Reform was merely a halfway measure for Bliss. Therefore for Bliss, Christian socialism was a fundamentally socialist ideology rooted in Christian principles. He hated the idea that people who tried to apply Christianity to social problems would even try to apply the label Christian Socialism to their work.

== Scholarly dispute ==
Bliss’s understanding of Christian Socialism and its fit with “genuine political socialism” is a point of contention, however, for many radical Marxist historians. Although his ideas were distinctively separate from and more radical than the popular social gospel thinkers who merely wanted progressive reform, many scholars still do not want to label Bliss's ideology to be socialist because it lacked real radicalism. Despite condemning capitalism as a dangerous plutocracy founded on economic individualism and his demands for an entirely new political economic order, many historians still find Bliss to be too moderate for socialist standards because of his wiliness to work with progressive reform centered institutions. These scholars argue that Bliss and other Christian socialists of the day offered watered-down versions of socialism due to their practical goals, respect for unions and the insentience on gradualism. Bliss's willingness to work with the Knights of labor, the populist and other less radical political affiliations push critics to assert that Bliss was not only comfortable with simply achieving small piecemeal reform but that he thought this was the most effective way to achieve a socialist society.

There has been some push back on the idea that Bliss was too moderate to be classified within the socialist movement of the Gilded Age. Richard Dressner, in particular, argues that scholars who have labeled Bliss as a moderate have limited the scope of their analysis to the first few decades of his work and have not considered the entire trajectory of his work as a preacher and activist. Most notably, his years with the Christian Socialist Fellowship. According to Dressner, not only was Bliss pushing socialist principles from the pulpit, he was also trying to destigmatize the anti-religious nature of the socialist party itself. During his time with the Fellowship, Bliss along with many of the other Christian socialists moved away from their gradualist perspective and pushed for more immediate political change by writing approvingly not just of workers demanding improved conditions, but of labor strikes that became violent in order to achieve their radical ends. Furthermore, once elected to the executive committee of the Christian Socialist Fellowship, Bliss approved of the fellowship's full endorsement of the socialist party and even advocated Christians to vote the socialist party ticket. Dresser argues that to suggest that Bliss was merely lukewarm to socialism is to not understand the complexity of Bliss. Although early on he frequently worked with moderate progressive reformers, as the times and circumstances changed, Bliss saw his view of Christian socialism directly in line with even the most radical socialist of the day.

== Political career ==
Bliss had a lengthy and diverse political career while serving as a minister in the Episcopal church.

For one his first political projects, Bliss helped found the American branch of the leftist-leaning Christian Social Union to condemn capitalism and push Christianity to take on a socialist agenda (1884 to 1887).

Bliss also served as member of the Knights of Labor, beginning in 1886, advocating more moderate reform he believed would be a necessary foundation in order to achieve his socialist vision for America.

In 1887 Bliss ran for Lieutenant Governorship of Massachusetts as a candidate of the Labor Party, but lost the election. Shortly after his political campaign for lieutenant Governor, Bliss founded the Society of Christian Socialists (SCS) in 1889. During that same time he also helped to create a Christian socialist newspaper called The Dawn, which he later bought in 1891 in order to bring a more socialist message to the paper. Much like his more general philosophy in regards to Christian Socialism, the goal of these projects were to the show that “the aim of socialism is embraced in the aim of christianity” and that the” teachings of Jesus Christ lead directly to some specific form of socialism”.

During these years Bliss also edited and compiled many publications, including the Encyclopedia of Social Reform beginning in 1897. This was the definitive reference work on social movements published during the Progressive Era. Not only did it describe social movements, The Encyclopedia of Social Reform further articulated Bliss's belief that the church and organized religion were viable vehicles of social and economic revolution in America.

Following his time with the Society of Christian Socialists and The Dawn, Bliss took on a job as an investigator for the Bureau of Labor from 1907 to 1909 to highlight and eventually improve working conditions for laborers.

=== Bliss and the Christian Socialist Fellowship ===
Bliss played an integral role within the Christian Socialist Fellowship. As the Fellowship convention, Bliss was elected to the Committee on Constitution, and his entire speech was included in the Christian Socialist Report of the conference.

After 1910 he accepted a position within the Committee on Literature to write a series of Sunday school lessons through a socialist lens. That same year he also became one of the contributing editors to the newspaper of the fellowship called the Christian Socialist and eventually was elected as the General Treasurer of the fellowship in 1911.

=== Final public service years ===
In 1914, Bliss traveled to Switzerland to work with the YMCA, and served as a pastor and YMCA worker in that country until 1921. During the First World War, Bliss ministered to French and Belgian soldiers interned in Switzerland.

== Death and legacy ==
After the war, Bliss returned to the United States and preached in New York City until his death in that city on October 8, 1926.

== Works ==
- Socialism in the Church of England. Boston. 1888.
- What Is Christian Socialism?. Boston: Society of Christian Socialists. 1890.
- The Communism of John Ruskin. Editor. Boston. 1891.
- What Christian Socialism Is. Boston: Office of the Dawn. 1894.
- Objections to Christian Socialism. Boston: Office of the Dawn. 1894.
- The Social Faith of the Catholic Church: Or, the Lesson of Fellowship in Unity; A Sermon for Trinity Sunday. Boston: Office of the Dawn. 1894.
- "What Is Socialism?" Roslindale, Massachusetts: The Dawn. 1894. OCLC 152425588.
- A Handbook of Socialism. London: Swan Sonnenschein & Co. 1895.
- Arbitration and Conciliation in Industrial Disputes. Boston: Church Social Union. 1895.
- American Trade Unions. Boston: Church Social Union. 1896.
- The Encyclopedia of Social Reform. New York: Funk & Wagnalls. 1897. OCLC 920444326.
- What to Do: A Programme of Christian Socialism. San Francisco: Rembaugh. [1890s].
- A Plea for the Union of the Reform Forces with the Democratic Party. New York: Commercial Printing House. c. 1900.
- "What Is Done for the Unemployed in European Countries". Bulletin of the Bureau of Labor. Vol. 16, no. 76. 1908. pp. 741–934.
- The New Encyclopedia of Social Reform. Edited with Binder, Rudolph Michael; Gaston, Edward Page. New York: Funk & Wagnalls. 1908.

== See also ==
- William Reed Huntington
