= Edward Bellamy =

American author (1850–1898)

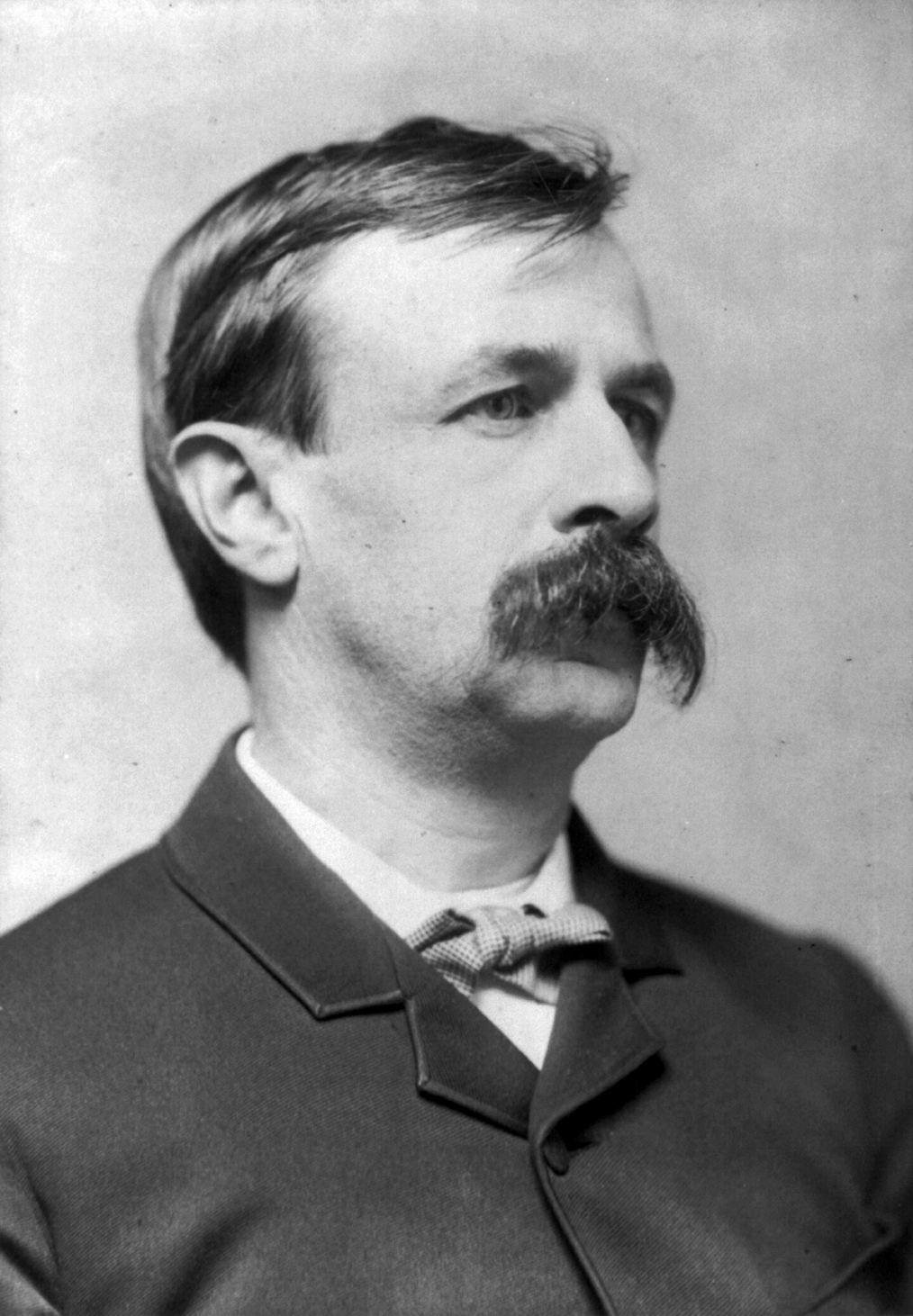
- Edward Bellamy, circa 1889
- Born: March 26, 1850; Chicopee, Massachusetts, US
- Died: May 22, 1898 (aged 48); Chicopee, Massachusetts, US
- Occupation: Author
- Relatives: Francis Bellamy (cousin)
- Writing career
- Notable works: Dr. Heidenhoff's Process (1880); Looking Backward, 2000–1887 (1888); To Whom This May Come (1889); Equality (1897)
- Website: edwardbellamyhouse.org

Signature
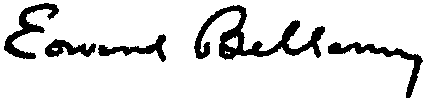

Edward Bellamy (/ˈbɛləmi/; March 26, 1850 – May 22, 1898) was an American author, journalist, and political activist most famous for his utopian novel Looking Backward. Bellamy's vision of a harmonious future world inspired the formation of numerous "Nationalist Clubs" dedicated to the propagation of state ownership of the main pillars of the economy, achieved through nationalization.

After working as a journalist and writing several novels, Bellamy published Looking Backward in 1888. It was the third best-selling novel of the 19th century in the United States, and it especially appealed to a generation of intellectuals alienated by the perceived dark side of the Gilded Age. In the early 1890s, Bellamy established a newspaper known as The New Nation and began to promote united action between the various Nationalist Clubs and the emerging Populist Party. He published Equality, a sequel to Looking Backward, in 1897, and died the following year.

== Biography ==
=== Early life ===
Edward Bellamy was born in Chicopee, Massachusetts. His father was Rufus King Bellamy (1816–1886), a Baptist minister and a descendant of Joseph Bellamy. His mother, Maria Louisa Putnam Bellamy, was a Calvinist. She was the daughter of a Baptist minister named Benjamin Putnam, who was forced to withdraw from the ministry in Salem, Massachusetts, following objections to his becoming a Freemason.

Bellamy attended public school at Chicopee Falls before leaving for Union College of Schenectady, New York, where he studied for just two semesters. Upon leaving school, he made his way to Europe for a year, spending extensive time in Germany. He briefly studied law but abandoned that field without ever having practiced as a lawyer, instead entering the world of journalism. In this capacity Bellamy briefly served on the staff of the New York Post before returning to his native Massachusetts to take a position at the Springfield Union.

At the age of 25, Bellamy developed tuberculosis, the disease that would ultimately kill him. He suffered with its effects throughout his adult life. In an effort to regain his health, Bellamy spent a year in the Hawaiian Islands (1877 to 1878). Returning to the United States, he decided to abandon the daily grind of journalism in favor of literary work, which put fewer demands upon his time and his health.

Bellamy married Emma Augusta Sanderson in 1882. The couple had two children.

=== Literary career ===
In 1874 Bellamy authored the Religion of Solidarity, a mystical book on the strong and unbreakable ties between men.

Fictional treatments

- Bellamy, Edward (1900). The Duke of Stockbridge: A Romance of Shays' Rebellion. New York, Boston, and Chicago: Silver, Burdett & Co. OCLC 656929797. (Fictional depiction of the rebellion, as social commentary.)

Bellamy's early novels, including Six to One (1878), Dr. Heidenhoff's Process (1880), and Miss Ludington's Sister (1885), were unremarkable works, making use of standard psychological plots. His novel The Duke of Stockbridge, written in 1879 and not published until 1900, took the side of debt-ridden farmers who launched Shays's Rebellion against debt collectors and scheming lawyers. (Bellamy, Edward (1900). The Duke of Stockbridge: A Romance of Shays' Rebellion. New York, Boston, and Chicago: Silver, Burdett & Co. OCLC 656929797.)

A turn to utopian science fiction with Looking Backward, 2000–1887, published in January 1888, captured the public imagination and catapulted Bellamy to literary fame. Its publisher could scarcely keep up with demand. Within a year he sold some 200,000 copies, and by the end of the 19th century the book had sold more copies than any other book published in America up to that time except for Uncle Tom's Cabin by Harriet Beecher Stowe and Ben-Hur: A Tale of the Christ by Lew Wallace. The book gained an extensive readership in the United Kingdom as well, more than 235,000 copies being sold there between 1890 and 1935.

In Looking Backward, technological advances and a non-violent revolution had transformed the American economy and thereby society; private property had been abolished in favor of state ownership of capital (the means of production and exchange). The social classes had been elimination of and the ills of society that he thought inevitably followed from them. In the new world of the year 2000, there was no longer war, poverty, crime, prostitution, corruption, money, or taxes. Neither did there exist such occupations seen by Bellamy as of dubious worth to society, such as politicians, lawyers, merchants, or soldiers. Instead, Bellamy's utopian society of the future was based upon the voluntary employment of all citizens between the ages of 21 and 45, after which time all were allowed to retire and devote their time to self-chosen hobbies.

Work was simple, aided by machine production, working hours short and vacation time long. The new economy effectively remade human nature itself in Bellamy's idyllic vision, with greed, maliciousness, untruthfulness, and insanity all relegated to the past. The individual was subsumed in the group as Bellamy's Religion of Solidarity had called for.

== Bellamyite movement ==
Bellamy's book inspired legions of readers to establish so-called Nationalist Clubs, beginning in Boston late in 1888. His vision of a country relieved of its social ills through abandonment of the principle of competition and establishment of state ownership of industry proved an appealing panacea to a generation of intellectuals alienated from the dark side of Gilded Age America. By 1891 at least 161 Nationalist Clubs were reportedly in existence.

Bellamy's use of the term "Nationalism", rather than "socialism", as a descriptor of his governmental vision was a calculated choice, as he did not want to limit either sales of his novel or the potential influence of its political ideas. In an 1888 letter to literary critic William Dean Howells, Bellamy wrote:

Every sensible man will admit there is a big deal in a name, especially in making first impressions. In the radicalness of the opinions I have expressed, I may seem to out-socialize the socialists, yet the word socialist is one I never could well stomach. In the first place it is a foreign word in itself, and equally foreign in all its suggestions. It smells to the average American of petroleum, suggests the red flag, and with all manner of sexual novelties, and an abusive tone about God and religion, which in this country we at least treat with respect. [...] [W]hatever German and French reformers may choose to call themselves, socialist is not a good name for a party to succeed with in America. No such party can or ought to succeed that is not wholly and enthusiastically American and patriotic in spirit and suggestions.

Bellamy actively participated in the political movement that emerged from his book, particularly after 1891 when he founded a magazine, The New Nation, and began to promote united action between the various Nationalist Clubs and the emerging People's Party. For the next three and a half years, Bellamy gave his all to politics, publishing his magazine, working to influence the platform of the People's Party, and publicizing the Nationalist movement in the popular press. Bellamy authored a document entitled The Programme of the Nationalists, which was published in the intellectual journal The Forum in March 1894. This phase of his life came to an end in 1894, when he suspended publication of The New Nation owing to financial difficulties.

With the key activists of the Nationalist Clubs largely absorbed into the apparatus of the People's Party (although a Nationalist Party did run three candidates for office in Wisconsin as late as 1896), Bellamy abandoned politics for a return to literature. He set to work on a sequel to Looking Backward titled Equality, attempting to deal with the ideal society of the post-revolutionary future in greater detail. In this final work, he addressed the question of feminism, dealing with the taboo subject of female reproductive rights in a future, post-revolutionary America. Other subjects overlooked in Looking Backward, such as animal rights and wilderness preservation, were dealt with in a similar context. The book saw print in 1897 and would prove to be Bellamy's final creation.

Several short stories of Bellamy's were published in 1898, and The Duke of Stockbridge; a Romance of Shays' Rebellion was published in 1900.

=== Death and legacy ===
Edward Bellamy died of tuberculosis in Chicopee Falls, Massachusetts ten years after the publication of his most famous book. He was 48 years old.

His lifelong home in Chicopee Falls, built by his father, was designated a National Historic Landmark in 1971.

Bellamy was the cousin of Francis Bellamy, famous for writing the original version of the Pledge of Allegiance.

Bellamy Road, a residential road in Toronto, is named for the author.

In July, 1967 a street in Co-op City, the Bronx, New York was named in honor of Bellamy (Bellamy Loop).

His book Looking Backward inspired other writers. Solomon Schindler authored Young West: A Sequel to Bellamy's Looking Backward in 1894. Richard Michaelis wrote Looking Further Forward. An Answer to Looking Backward, by Edward Bellamy, in 1890, in which he put forward that a better way to alleviate the threat of poverty is through voluntary "co-operation and mutual insurance companies."

== Published works ==
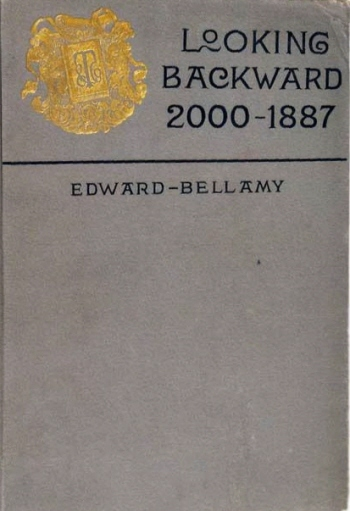

=== Novels ===
- Six to One (1878)
- The Duke of Stockbridge; a Romance of Shays' Rebellion (1879) (published posthumously in 1900)
- Dr. Heidenhoff's Process (1880)
- Miss Ludington's Sister (1885)
- Looking Backward, 2000–1887 (1888)
- Equality (1897)

=== Short stories ===
- "At Pinney's Ranch"
- "The Blindman's World"
- "Deserted"
- "An Echo Of Antietam"
- "Hooking Watermelons"
- "Lost"
- "A Love Story Reversed"
- "The Old Folks' Party"
- "A Positive Romance"
- "Potts's Painless Cure"
- "A Summer Evening's Dream"
- "To Whom This May Come"
- "Two Days' Solitary Imprisonment"
- "With The Eyes Shut"
- "The Cold Snap"
- "The Old Folks' Party"

=== Other ===
- How to employ the unemployed in mutual maintenance: the following outline of the mutual maintenance method of employing the unemployed (1893) (an 8-page plan for a self-sufficient settlement, with its own scrip)
- Edward Bellamy Speaks Again! (1937) (posthumous)
- Talks on Nationalism (1938) (posthumous)

== See also ==
- Dutch Bellamy Party
- Equality Colony
- Monument to credit card
- Nationalist Clubs
- The Nationalist

== Bibliography ==
- Six to One: A Nantucket Idyl. New York: G.P. Putnam's Sons, 1878.
- Dr. Heidenhoff's Process. London: William Reeves, 1880.
- Miss Ludington's Sister: A Romance of Immorality. Boston: James R. Osgoode and Co., 1885.
- Looking Backward, 2000–1887. Boston: Houghton, Mifflin Co., 1889.
- "How I Came to Write Looking Backward", The Nationalist (Boston), vol. 1, no. 1 (May 1889), pp. 1–4.
- Plutocracy or Nationalism – Which?
- Principles and Purposes of Nationalism: Edward Bellamy's Address at Tremont Temple, Boston, on the Nationalist Club's First Anniversary, Dec. 19, 1889. Philadelphia: Bureau of Nationalist Literature, n.d. [1890].
- The Programme of the Nationalists. Philadelphia: Bureau of Nationalist Literature, 1894. —First published in The Forum, March 1894.
- Equality. New York: D. Appleton & Co., 1898.
- The Blindman's World and Other Stories. William Dean Howells, intro. Boston: Houghton, Mifflin and Co., 1898.
- The Duke of Stockbridge: A Romance of Shays' Rebellion. New York: Silver, Burdett and Co., 1900.
- Edward Bellamy: Selected Writings on Religion and Society. Joseph Schiffman (ed.) New York: Liberal Arts Press, 1955.
- Apparitions of Things to Come: Edward Bellamy's Tales of Mystery & Imagination. Franklin Rosemont, ed. Chicago: Charles H. Kerr Publishing Company, 1990.
