= Big Dick =

Big Dick may refer to:

- A large human penis
- "Big Dick", a comic strip by Joe Johnson
- Big Dick Creek, a stream in Idaho, US
- Big Dick Dudley, an American wrestler
- Big Dick Lake, a lake in Minnesota, US
- Big Dick Point, a summit in Idaho, US

== See also ==
- Dick (disambiguation)
- Big Cock (disambiguation)
