= Old Colony & Fall River Railroad Museum =

Former railroad museum in Fall River, Massachusetts

Coordinates: 41°42′15.3″N 71°9′45.7″W

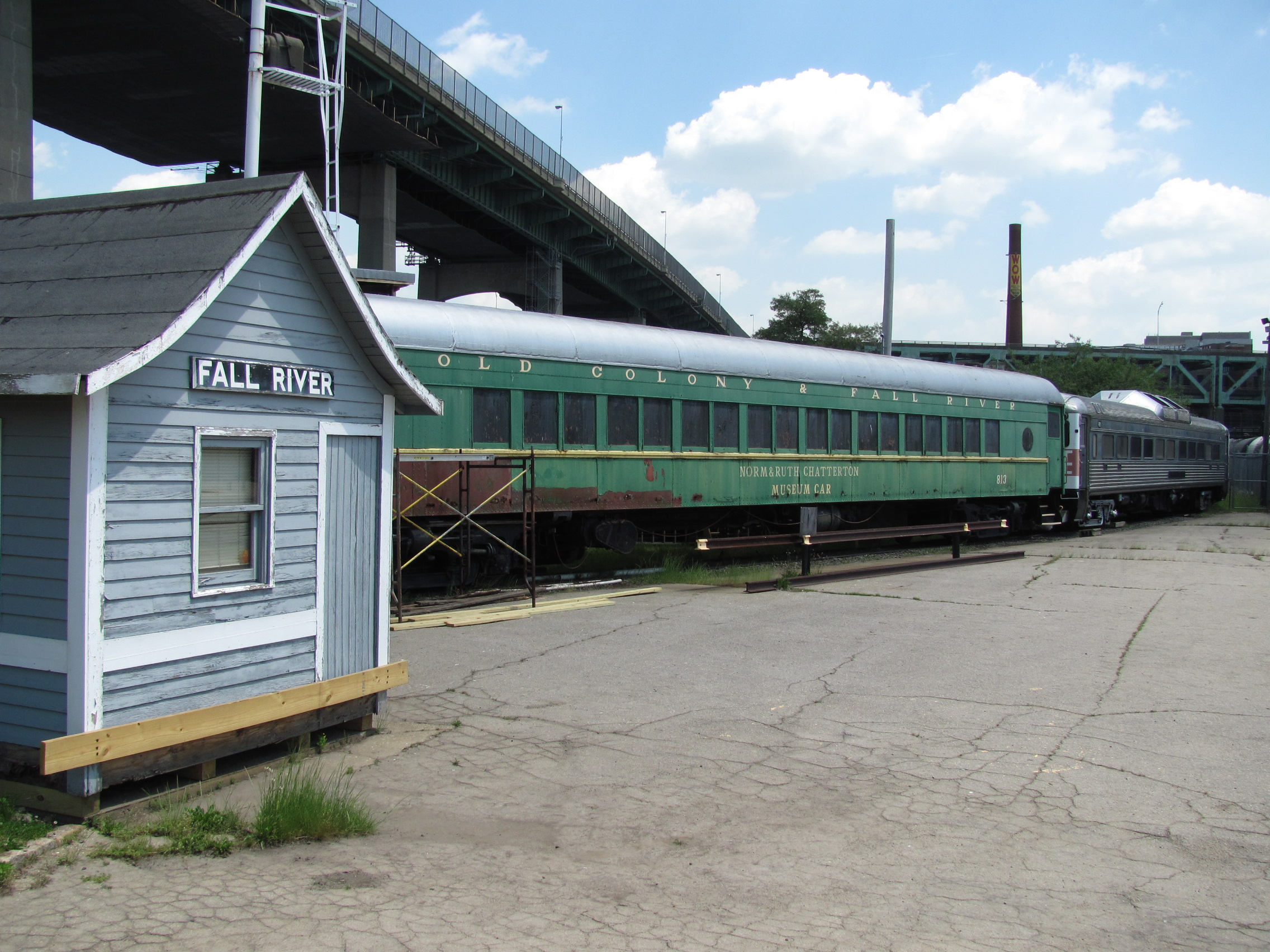
- Old Colony and Fall River Railroad Museum
- Established: 1986
- Dissolved: 2016
- Location: 2 Water Street, Fall River, Massachusetts
- Director: Jay Chatterton

The Old Colony & Fall River Railroad Museum was a small railroad museum located in Fall River, Massachusetts. The Old Colony and Fall River Railroad operated from 1854 to 1863, and later as part of the extensive Old Colony Railroad system. The museum is located directly across from the former Fall River Line Terminal, part of the Old Colony's "boat train" service between Boston and New York City, and is also nearby Battleship Cove, Fall River Heritage State Park, the Narrows Center for the Arts, and the Marine Museum at Fall River.

The museum had a small collection of railroad equipment including a former Pennsylvania Railroad P-70B, a New Haven RDC, a former New York Central Caboose, and a New Haven Boxcar.

== Closure ==
The museum saw its height of popularity during the 1990s through the early 2000s, seeing 45 visitors a day. After around 2009, admissions declined to around five people per day, and the museum had trouble paying the bills. The museum closed in September 2016, after operating for 30 seasons.

== Equipment Disposition ==
Pennsylvania Railroad P-70B Passenger Coach - stored on track 7 in Fall River Wharf yard.

New Haven RDC #42 - sold to Berkshire Scenic Railway Museum.

New York Central Caboose #21052 - now used on Massachusetts Coastal Railroad ballast trains.

New Haven boxcar #33401 - sold to Cape Cod Chapter of the NRHS in West Barnstable, MA.

== See also ==
- Battleship Cove
- Braga Bridge
- Fall River Heritage State Park
