= PT Boat Museum =

Coordinates: 41°42′18.1″N 71°9′47.1″W

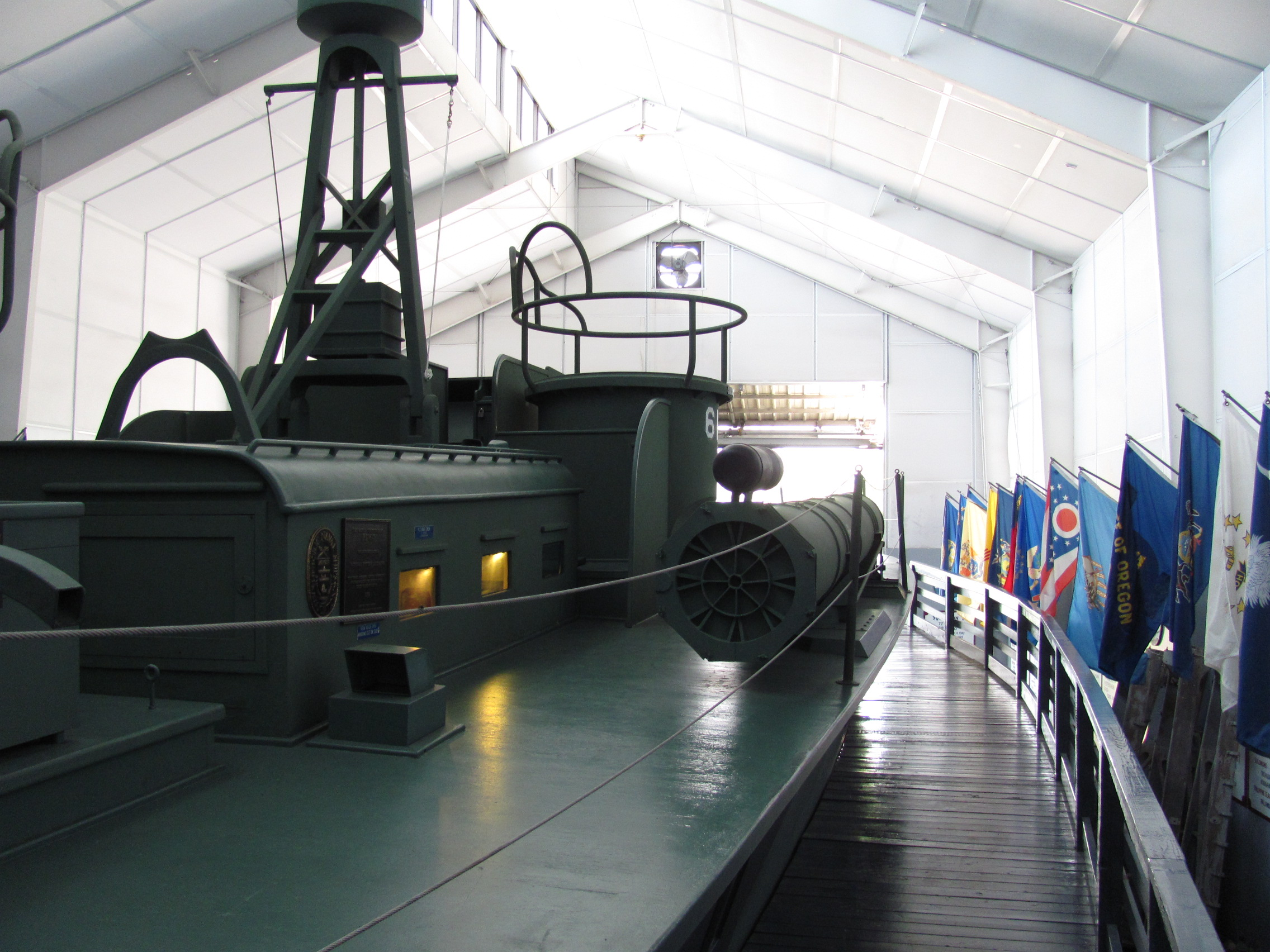
PT Boat Museum at Battleship Cove

PT Boat Museum is located in Fall River, Massachusetts as part of Battleship Cove. It is a museum that exhibits two National Historic Landmark ships, an 80-foot (24.4 m) Elco boat, PT 617, and a 78-foot (23.8 m) Higgins boat, PT 796.
