= Big Cock =

Big Cock may refer to:

- An unusually large human penis size
- An unusually large rooster
- Big Cock, a 1986 album by King Kurt
- Big Cock, a fictional character in The Eleven Little Roosters
- "Big Cock", an episode of Trailer Park Boys
- Big Cocks, a series of photographs by Heji Shin

== See also ==
- Cockerel
- Patrol torpedo boat PT-617, also known as Big Red Cock
- Cock (disambiguation)
- Big Dick (disambiguation)
- Big Chicken
