= Long Dick Creek =

River in Iowa, USA

Coordinates: 42.169429°N 93.576048°W

Long Dick Creek is a stream in Hamilton and Story counties, Iowa, in the United States. It is a tributary of the Skunk River.

Long Dick Creek was named after one tall man named Richard "Long Dick", an early settler. The first schoolhouse in Story County was established near Long Dick Creek, in 1855.

== See also ==
- Big Dick Creek
- List of rivers of Iowa
- Unusual place names
