= Patrol torpedo boat PT-617 =

Torpedo boat of the United States Navy

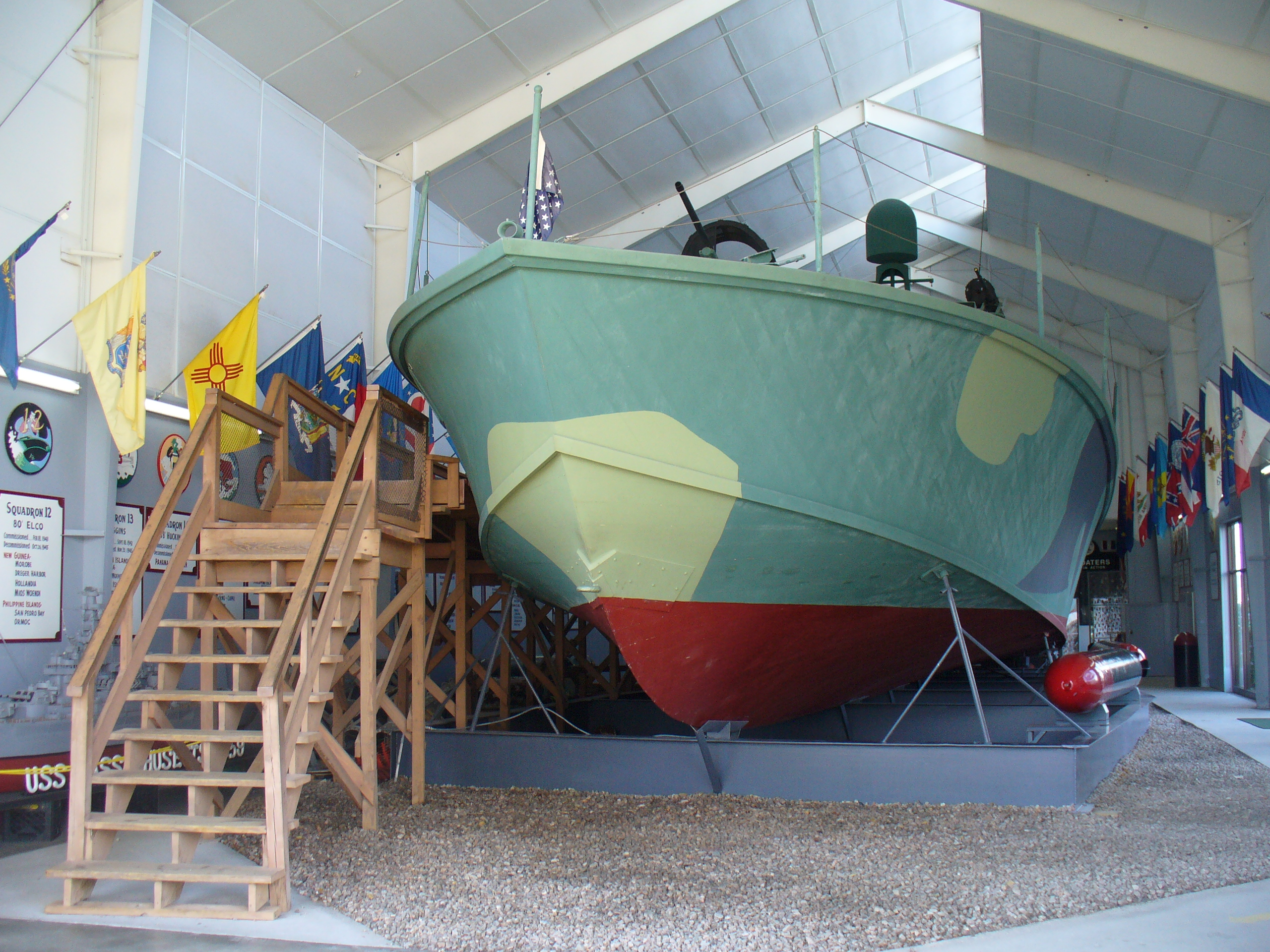
- PT-617

History

United States
- Name: PT-617
- Builder: Electric Launch Company
- Laid down: 29 March 1945
- Launched: 28 July 1945
- Completed: 21 September 1945
- Out of service: 28 January 1946
- Nickname(s): Big Red Cock, Dragon Lady
- Status: Sold 23 October 1947, Museum ship from 1 September 1985

General characteristics
- Displacement: 55 long tons (56 t)
- Length: 80 ft (24 m)
- Beam: 20 ft (6.1 m)
- Draft: 5 ft 6 in (1.68 m)
- Installed power: 3 × 1,350 shp (1,007 kW) Packard 4M-2500 12-cylinder engines
- Propulsion: 3 shafts
- Speed: 40 knots (74 km/h; 46 mph)
- Range: 500 nmi (930 km; 580 mi)
- Armament: 4 × 22.5 in (570 mm) Mark 13 torpedoes; 1 × 37 mm (1.5 in) gun; 2 × 20 mm (0.79 in) guns; 1 × Bofors 40 mm gun; 2 × twin .50 caliber M2 Browning machine guns; 2 × depth charges; 2 × Mark 50 rocket launchers; 1 × 60 mm (2.4 in) M2 mortar; 1 × smoke generator
- PT 617
- U.S. National Register of Historic Places
- U.S. National Historic Landmark
- Location within Massachusetts
- Location: Battleship Cove, Fall River, Massachusetts
- Coordinates: 41°42′19″N 71°9′48″W
- Built: 1945
- Architect: Electric Boat Co.
- NRHP reference No.: 89002465

Significant dates
- Added to NRHP: 20 December 1989
- Designated NHL: 20 December 1989

Motor torpedo boat PT-617, also known as Big Red Cock and Dragon Lady, "is the sole surviving 80' Elco type PT boat and represents the United States's most heavily used, highly favored, and combat-tested PT boat type in World War II." She is a museum ship at the PT Boat Museum in Fall River, Massachusetts. The 80-foot (24 m) Elco type boat was the predominant type and is the same type as the famous PT-109 commanded by John F. Kennedy; the 78-foot (24 m) "Higgins" boat is the other type.

PT-617 was declared a National Historic Landmark in 1989.

== Design ==
PT-617 is a PT-103-class ELCO motor torpedo boat. The hull was constructed of two layers of mahogany planking laid diagonally over laminated spruce, white oak, and mahogany frames, reinforced with longitudinal battens, secondary transverse frames, and clamps. A layer of fabric, impregnated with marine glue, was laid between the two layers of planking.

The boat had a displacement of 55 long tons (56 t) (fully loaded) and was 80 ft (24 m) in length, with a beam of 20 ft (6.1 m), and a draft of 5 ft 6 in (1.68 m). Her three liquid-cooled, supercharged, 12-cylinder 1,350 shp (1,007 kW) Packard 4M-2500 engines each drove a single shaft, giving the boat a top speed of 40 knots (74 km/h; 46 mph). With a full load of 3,000 gallons (9 tons) of high octane aviation fuel she had a maximum cruising radius of 500 nautical miles (930 km; 580 mi).

PT-617 was very heavily armed for her size with four 22.5 in (570 mm) Mark 13 torpedoes, a 37 mm (1.5 in) and two 20 mm (0.79 in) guns in the bows, a Bofors 40 mm gun at the stern, and two twin .50 caliber M2 Browning machine guns in mounts each side of the cockpit. There were also two depth charges mounted on racks on the stern, along with a smoke generator. Two Mark 50 rocket launchers and a 60 mm (2.4 in) mortar were also installed. In addition the crew were issued with small arms, each man carrying a M1911.45 caliber pistol, and the boat carried a .30 caliber Browning Automatic Rifle, M1903 Springfield .30-06 bolt-action rifles, .45 caliber Thompson submachine guns, 3-inch rockets, and Mk 2 grenades.

== Ship history ==
PT-617 was built by the Electric Launch Company of Bayonne, New Jersey. Laid down on 29 March 1945, and launched on 28 July, she was not completed until 21 September, after the end of the war. The boat was assigned to MTB Squadron 42 and slated for service with the Pacific Fleet, but this was later cancelled. The boat was placed out of service on 28 January 1946, and finally sold on 23 October 1947.

In private hands the boat served as a yacht, for salvage purposes, and as a diving platform. She was bought by PT Boats, Inc. in 1979, and after restoration to her World War II configuration officially went on display on 1 September 1985.

== See also ==
- National Register of Historic Places listings in Fall River, Massachusetts
- List of National Historic Landmarks in Massachusetts
- Motor torpedo boat PT-796
- Motor torpedo boat PT-658
