= Fall River Heritage State Park =

State park in Bristol County, Massachusetts

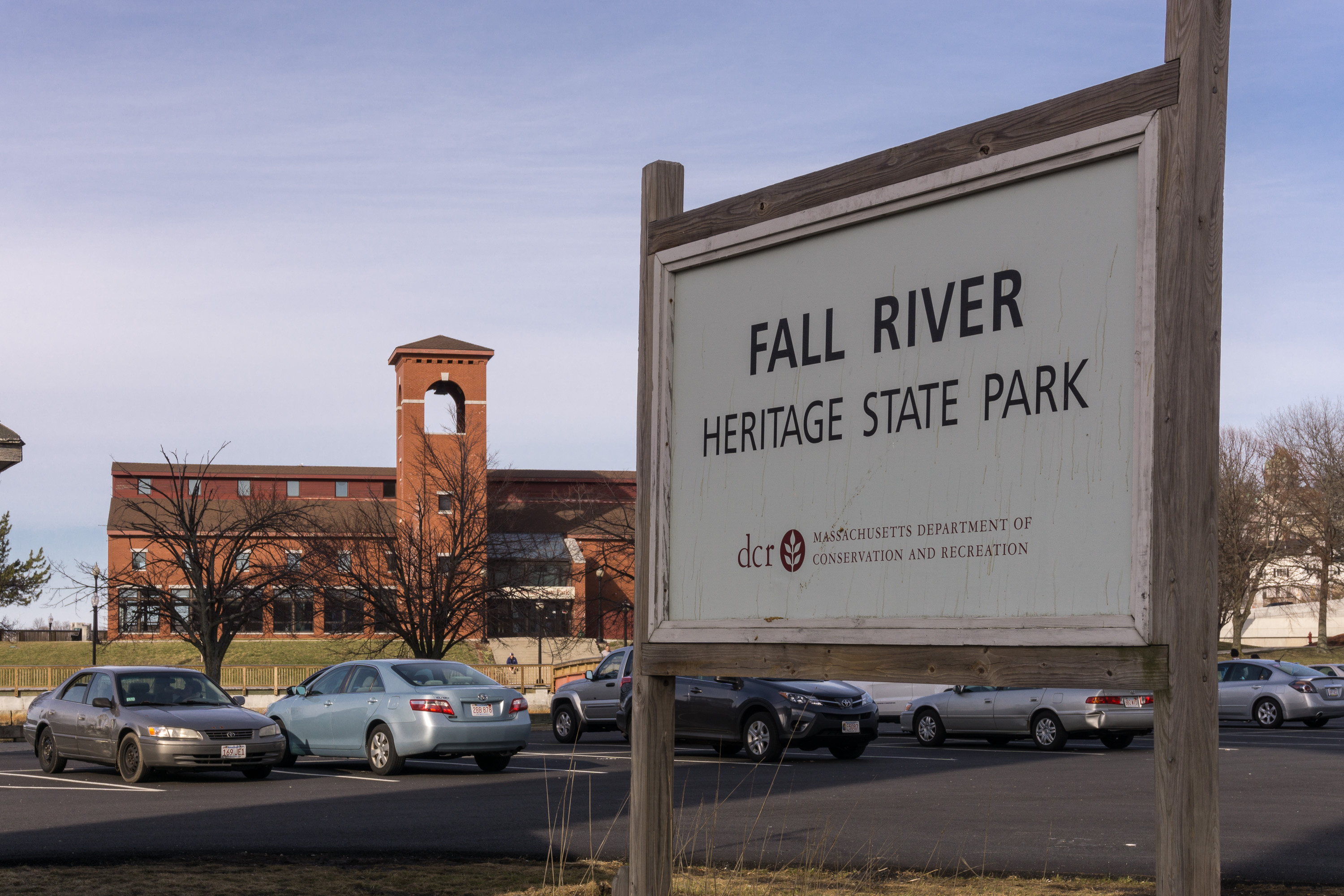

- Location within Massachusetts Location within the United States
- Location: Fall River, Massachusetts, United States
- Coordinates: 41°42′20″N 71°9′38″W
- Area: 14 acres (5.7 ha)
- Established: 1985
- Administrator: Massachusetts Department of Conservation and Recreation
- Website: Official website

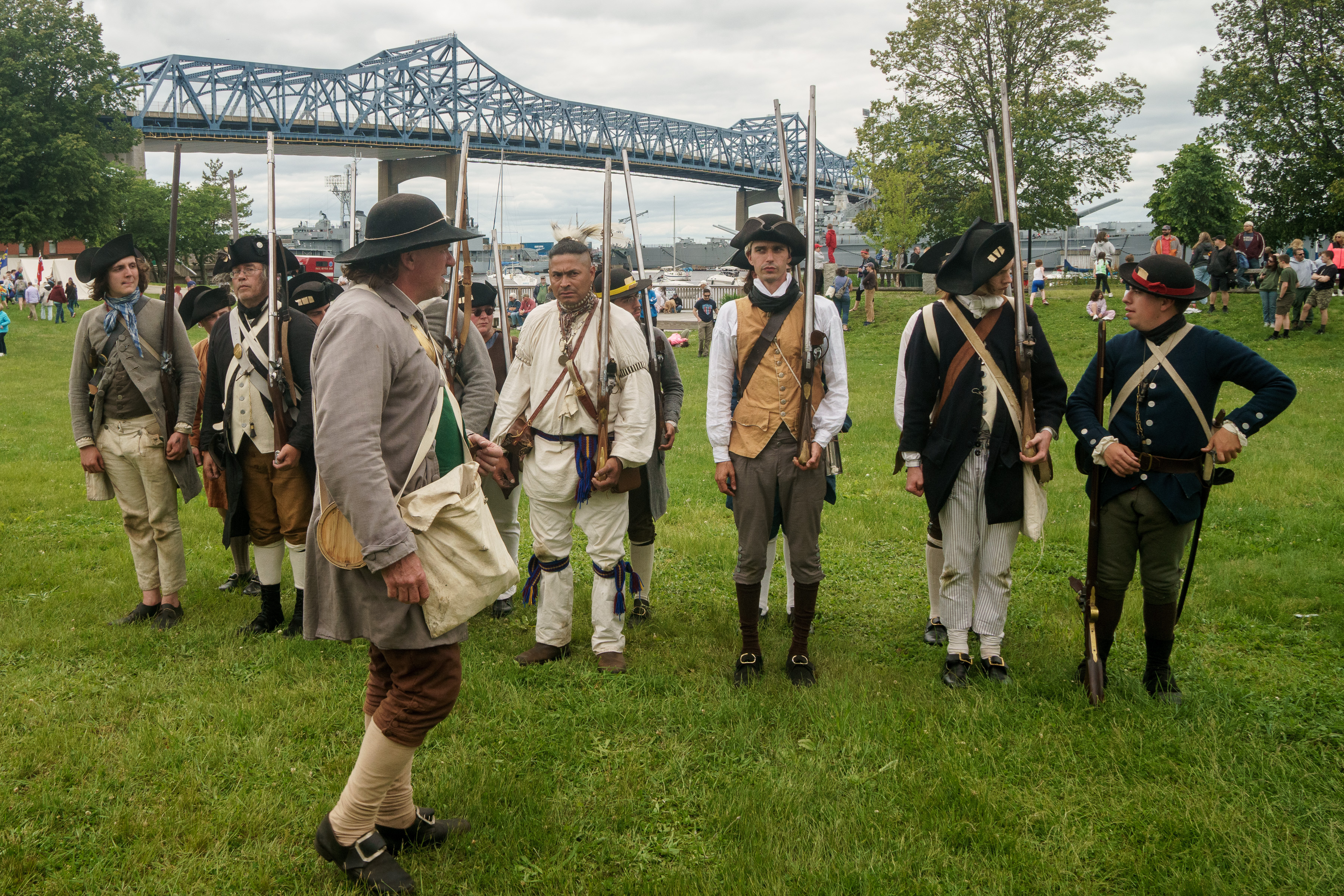
A reenactment of the "Battle of Fall River" at the park in 2025

Fall River Heritage State Park is a history-themed public recreation area on the Taunton River in Fall River, Massachusetts. The state park encompasses 14 acres (5.7 ha) beside the Charles M. Braga Jr. Memorial Bridge on Battleship Cove, home of the World War II battleship USS Massachusetts. The park is managed by the Massachusetts Department of Conservation and Recreation.

== Park history ==
The development of the state's heritage parks program began with the allocation of $35 million in 1978 for the creation of eight urban parks throughout Massachusetts. The program's aim was to create quality urban space, celebrate the communities' cultural heritage, and stimulate private economic investment. The visitors center at Fall River Heritage State Park opened to the public in 1985.

== Activities and amenities ==
In addition to its visitors center, the park offers a wheelchair-accessible boardwalk, a 3-acre (1.2 ha) meadow used for picnicking, concerts, and arts & crafts fairs, an antique carousel relocated from Dartmouth's Lincoln Park, and a public sailing program.
