= Big Dick Point =

Summit in Idaho, United States

Coordinates: 47°18′50.6″N 115°43′35.6″W

Highest point
- Elevation: 5,414 ft (1,650 m)

Geography
- Country: United States of America
- State: Idaho

Big Dick Point is a summit in Shoshone County, Idaho, in the United States. With an elevation of 5,414 feet (1,650 m), Big Dick Point is the 1,822nd tallest mountain in Idaho. It is located to the south of Big Dick Creek.
