= USS Lionfish =

Submarine of the United States

USS Lionfish (SS-298)
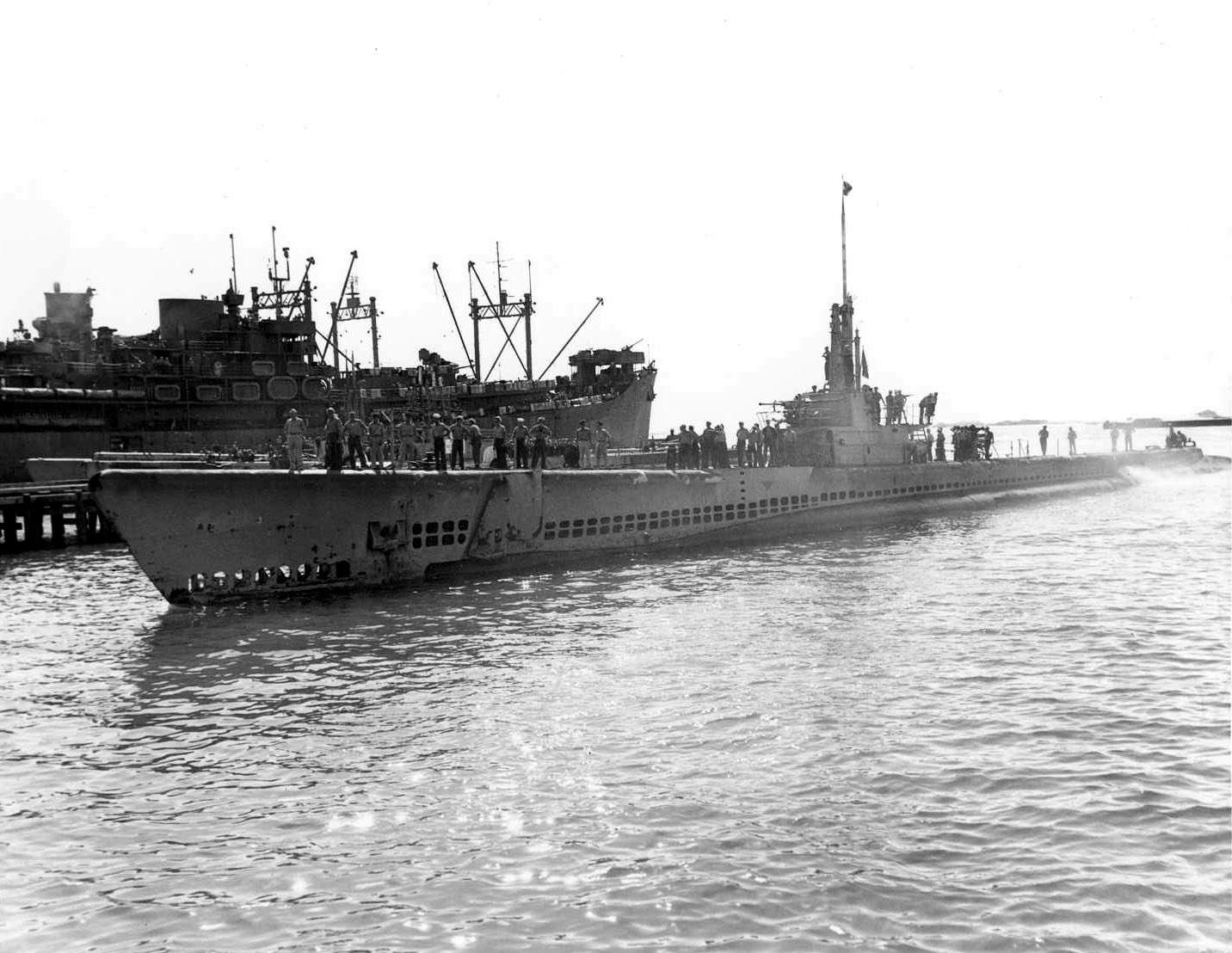
- USS Lionfish

History

United States
- Name: Lionfish
- Namesake: Lionfish
- Builder: Cramp Shipbuilding Co., Philadelphia; Portsmouth Naval Shipyard, Kittery, Maine
- Yard number: 553
- Laid down: 15 December 1942
- Launched: 7 November 1943
- Sponsored by: Mrs. Harold C. Train
- Commissioned: 1 November 1944
- Decommissioned: 16 January 1946
- Recommissioned: 31 January 1951
- Decommissioned: 15 December 1953
- Stricken: 20 December 1971
- Status: Museum ship at Battleship Cove, Fall River, Massachusetts since 30 August 1972

General characteristics
- Class & type: Balao-class submarine
- Displacement: 1,526 long tons (1,550 t) surfaced; 2,424 long tons (2,463 t) submerged
- Length: 311 ft 6 in (94.95 m)
- Beam: 27 ft 3 in (8.31 m)
- Draft: 16 ft 10 in (5.13 m) maximum
- Propulsion: 4 × Fairbanks-Morse Model 38D8-⅛ 9-cylinder opposed piston diesel engines driving electrical generators; 2 × 126-cell Sargo batteries; 4 × high-speed General Electric electric motors with reduction gears; two propellers; 5,400 shp (4.0 MW) surfaced; 2,740 shp (2.0 MW) submerged
- Speed: 20.25 knots (37.50 km/h; 23.30 mph) surfaced; 8.75 knots (16.21 km/h; 10.07 mph) submerged
- Range: 11,000 nmi (20,000 km; 13,000 mi) surfaced at 10 knots (19 km/h; 12 mph)
- Endurance: 48 hours at 2 knots (3.7 km/h; 2.3 mph) submerged; 75 days on patrol
- Test depth: 400 ft (120 m)
- Complement: 10 officers, 70–71 enlisted
- Armament: 10 × 21-inch (533 mm) torpedo tubes; 6 forward, 4 aft; 24 torpedoes; 1 × 5-inch (127 mm) / 25 caliber deck gun; Bofors 40 mm and Oerlikon 20 mm cannon
- USS Lionfish (SS-298)
- U.S. National Register of Historic Places
- U.S. National Historic Landmark
- Location within Massachusetts
- Location: Fall River, Massachusetts
- Coordinates: 41°42′22″N 71°09′47″W
- Built: 1943
- NRHP reference No.: 76002270

Significant dates
- Added to NRHP: 30 September 1976
- Designated NHL: 14 January 1986

USS Lionfish (SS-298), a Balao-class submarine, was the only ship of the United States Navy named for the lionfish. She was designated a National Historic Landmark in 1986, and is now on display at Battleship Cove in Fall River, Massachusetts.

== Construction and commissioning ==
Lionfish was laid down on 15 December 1942; launched on 7 November 1943, sponsored by Mrs. May Philipps Train, wife of Rear Admiral Harold C. Train; and commissioned on 1 November 1944. Her first commanding officer was Lieutenant Commander Edward D. Spruance, son of the admiral.

== World War II ==
After completing her shakedown cruise off New England, she began her first war patrol in Japanese waters on 1 April 1945. Ten days later, she avoided two torpedoes fired by a Japanese submarine. On 1 May, Lionfish destroyed a Japanese schooner with her deck guns. After a rendezvous with the submarine USS Ray (SS-271), she transported United States Army Air Forces B-29 Superfortress survivors to Saipan in the Mariana Islands and then made her way to Midway Atoll in the Northwestern Hawaiian Islands for replenishment.

On 2 June 1945 she started her second war patrol, and on 10 July 1945 fired torpedoes at a surfaced Japanese submarine I-162, after which Lionfish's crew heard explosions and observed smoke through their periscope, although I-162 was undamaged. She subsequently fired on two more Japanese submarines. Lionfish ended her second and last war patrol performing lifeguard duty (the rescue of downed fliers) off the coast of Japan. When World War II ended on 15 August 1945, she headed for San Francisco, California, and was decommissioned at Mare Island Navy Yard in Vallejo, California, on 16 January 1946.

== Post World War II ==
Lionfish was recommissioned on 31 January 1951, and headed for the United States East Coast for training cruises. After participating in NATO exercises and a Mediterranean cruise, she returned to the East Coast and was decommissioned at the Boston Navy Yard on 15 December 1953.

In 1960, the submarine was placed in service, but not recommissioned, as a reserve training submarine at Providence, Rhode Island.

== Museum ship ==
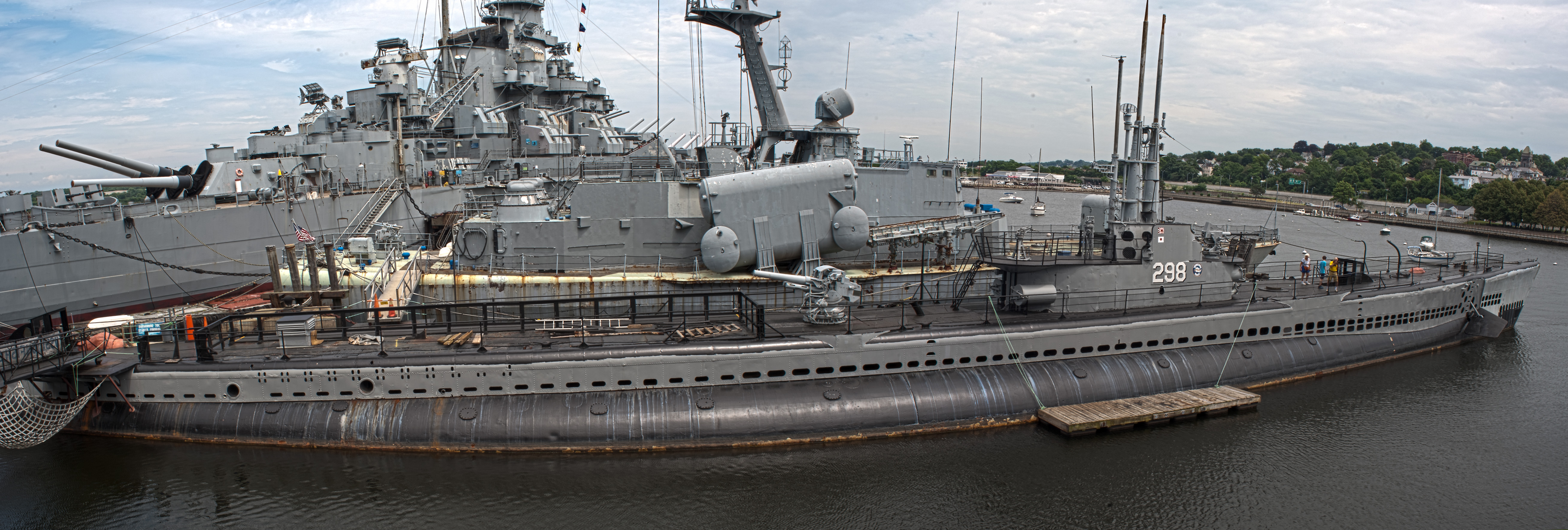
Lionfish as she appeared on 17 July 2019.

In 1971, she was stricken from the Navy Register. In 1973, she began permanent display as a memorial at Battleship Cove in Fall River, Massachusetts, where she is one of the museum's most popular exhibits.

As Lionfish was never converted to a GUPPY configuration, she is one of the very few preserved American World War II-era submarines in her "as built" configuration. Because of this state of preservation, she was designated a National Historic Landmark in 1986.

== In popular culture ==
The submarine is featured on the DVD case of the 2007 Ubisoft game Silent Hunter 4: Wolves of the Pacific.

The submarine was also featured in the 2015 movie drama Subconscious.

== Awards ==
- Asiatic-Pacific Campaign Medal with one battle star
- World War II Victory Medal
- Navy Occupation Medal with "EUROPE" clasp
- National Defense Service Medal

== See also ==
- List of National Historic Landmarks in Massachusetts
- National Register of Historic Places listings in Fall River, Massachusetts
