= Big Dick Lake =

Lake in the state of Minnesota, United States

- Location within Minnesota
- Location: Itasca County, Minnesota
- Coordinates: 47°36′38″N 93°36′33″W
- Type: lake
- Surface area: 256.2 acres (103.7 ha)

Big Dick Lake is a natural lake in Itasca County, Minnesota, in the United States. It is located within Chippewa National Forest. This lake has a surface area of 256.2 acres (103.7 ha).

Big Dick Lake is known for its good fishing, with large numbers of northern pike, crappies, Large mouth bass, blue gills, and perch, although for the latter two "the fish are small." In addition to those mentioned, there are Brown Bullhead. As well as those species, "fish species in the lake include Golden Shiner, Hybrid Sunfish and White Sucker."

The Lake has a wide range of plants growing "immersed", "emergent", and in a "wetland". Immersed plants include Najas flexilis (Bushy Pondweed), Potamogeton praelongus (White-stemmed Pondweed), and Utricularia vulgaris (Greater bladderwort). "Emergent Plants (Plants with leaves extending above the water surface)" include Equisetum fluviatile (Water horsetail), Sagittaria latifolia (Broad-leaved Arrowhead), and Typha latifolia (Broad-leaved cat-tail).

The Lake is also known for its unusual hydronym.

== See also ==
- List of lakes in Minnesota
- Unusual place names
