= Patrol torpedo boat PT-796 =

Torpedo boat of the United States Navy

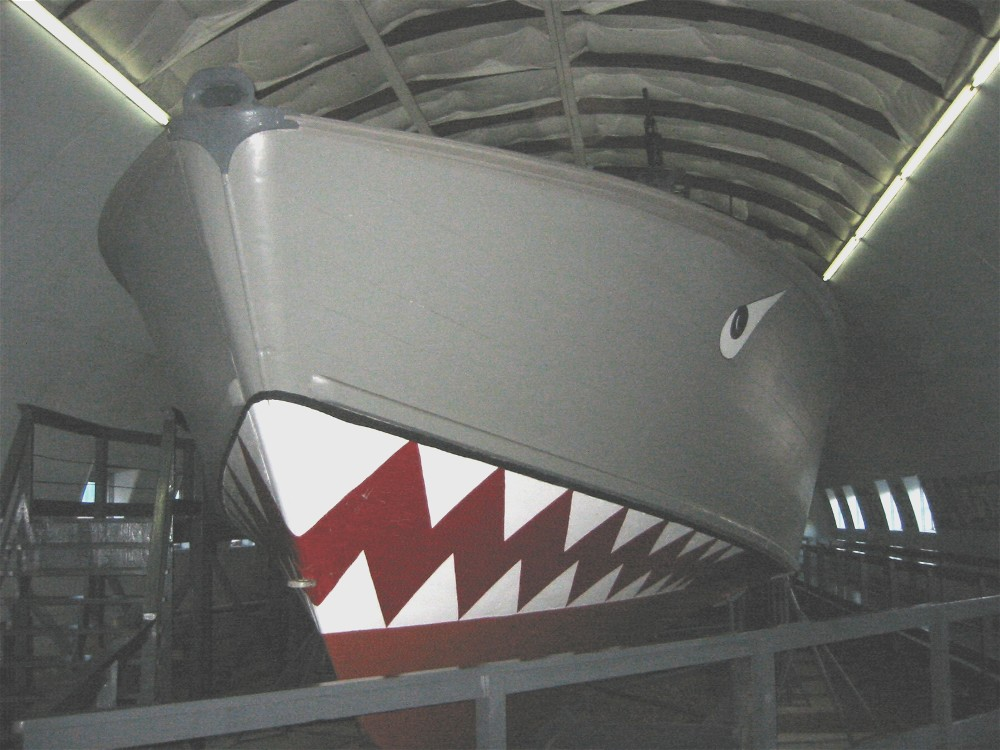
- On display at Battleship Cove

History

United States
- Builder: Higgins Industries
- Laid down: 3 May 1945
- Completed: 26 October 1945
- Out of service: 7 July 1970
- Reclassified: Small Boat 16 November 1945
- Nickname(s): Tail Ender
- Status: Museum ship from 14 August 1975

General characteristics
- Displacement: 48 long tons (49 t)
- Length: 78 ft (24 m)
- Beam: 20 ft 8 in (6.30 m)
- Draft: 4 ft (1.2 m)
- Installed power: 3 × 1,200 shp (895 kW) Packard V-12 engines
- Propulsion: 3 shafts
- Speed: 41 knots (76 km/h; 47 mph)
- Range: 358 nmi (663 km; 412 mi) at 35 kn (65 km/h; 40 mph); 1,050 nmi (1,940 km; 1,210 mi) at 11 knots (20 km/h; 13 mph)
- Armament: 4 × 22.5 in (570 mm) Mark 13 torpedoes; 1 × 37 mm (1.5 in) gun; 1 × 20 mm (0.79 in) gun; 1 × Bofors 40 mm gun; 2 × twin .50 caliber M2 Browning machine guns; 2 × Mark 50 5-inch (130 mm) rocket launchers; 1 × smoke generator
- PT boat 796 (torpedo boat)
- U.S. National Register of Historic Places
- U.S. National Historic Landmark
- Location within Massachusetts
- Location: Fall River, Massachusetts
- Coordinates: 41°42′19″N 71°9′48″W
- Built: 1945
- Architect: Higgins Co.
- NRHP reference No.: 86000092

Significant dates
- Added to NRHP: 14 January 1986
- Designated NHL: 14 January 1986

PT-796 is a 78-foot PT boat built by Higgins Industries of New Orleans in 1945. It was designated a National Historic Landmark in 1986 as one of a very few surviving World War II PT boats. A "Higgins" boat, she is part of the collection of the PT Boat Museum, which itself is part of the Battleship Cove museum in Fall River, Massachusetts.

== Design ==
PT-796 was laid down on 3 May 1945, launched on 23 June, and completed after the end of the war on 26 October. The last of her type to be constructed, she was nicknamed Tail Ender.

The hull was constructed of two layers of planking. Unlike earlier PT boats, where the layers were laid diagonally, the outer layer of PT-796's hull is laid longitudinally, a change to the design believed to have been made to Higgins boats sometime in late 1944. Also, instead of two layers of mahogany, the inner layer is spruce. The two layers are held together by copper rivets and bronze screws, with a sheet of canvas impregnated with marine glue between them.

The boat's full-load displacement is 48 long tons (49 t). She is 78 feet (24 m) in length, with a beam of 20 ft 8 in (6.30 m), and a draft of 4 ft (1.2 m). Her three 12-cylinder 1,200 shp (895 kW) Packard V-12 engines each drove a single shaft, giving the boat a top speed of 41 knots (76 km/h; 47 mph). With a full load of 3,000 gallons of 100 octane aviation fuel she had a range of 358 nautical miles (663 km; 412 mi) at a speed of 35 knots (65 km/h; 40 mph) or as far as 1,050 nautical miles (1,940 km; 1,210 mi) at a speed of 11 knots (20 km/h; 13 mph) using only one engine.

The boat was armed with four 22.5 in (570 mm) Mark 13 torpedoes on roll-off racks, 37 mm (1.5 in) and 20 mm (0.79 in) guns in the bows, a Bofors 40 mm gun at the stern, and two twin .50 caliber M2 Browning machine guns in mounts each side of the cockpit. She was also fitted with two Mark 50 5-inch (130 mm) rocket launchers, and a smoke generator at the stern.

== Ship history ==
Placed in service too late to take part in World War II, PT-796 saw temporary post-war duty as part of MTB Squadron 1, patrolling in the Caribbean and off the East Coast. She was reclassified as a "Small Boat" on 16 November 1945. Stripped of armament she was then assigned to the Navy Operational Development Force and Naval Ship Research Development Laboratory in Panama City, Florida, where she was used for high-speed towing experiments during the development of equipment for use in riverine operations. In 1961 she participated in John F. Kennedy's inauguration repainted as PT-109. The boat was placed out of service on 7 July 1970, and signed over to PT Boats, Inc. She was restored to her original configuration, and has been displayed at Battleship Cove since 14 August 1975.

== See also ==
- National Register of Historic Places listings in Fall River, Massachusetts
- List of National Historic Landmarks in Massachusetts
