= Big Dick Creek =

River in Idaho, USA

Coordinates: 47°19′29.1″N 115°43′49.1″W

Big Dick Creek is a stream in Shoshone County, Idaho, in the United States. It is a tributary to the north fork of the Saint Joe River.

== See also ==
- List of rivers of Idaho
- Long Dick Creek
- Unusual place names
