= The Sleeping Car =

Play by William Dean Howells

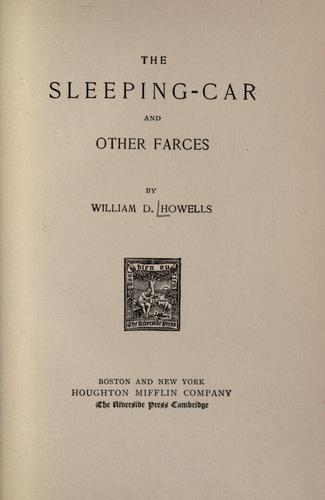
- A Later Edition of The Sleeping-Car
- Author: William Dean Howells
- Language: English
- Genre: Literary realism
- Publisher: J.R. Osgood and Co. / Ticknor and Fields
- Publication date: 1883 United States
- Publication place: United States
- Media type: Print
- Pages: 74
- Preceded by: Dr. Breen's Practice
- Followed by: A Modern Instance

The Sleeping Car is a farce play in three parts by William Dean Howells, first published in the United States in 1883. This play takes place entirely within a 24-hour period on a railway sleeping car, and revolves around a woman's late night confusion regarding the premature appearance of her husband and brother. This work is one of Howells' minor works, but reflects the same tendencies towards literary realism as many of Howells' more famous works, including The Rise of Silas Lapham and A Modern Instance. This play is not well-read amongst modern readers, and is often overlooked in literary discussion due to its relative contemporary obscurity. Currently, this work is not being published by any publishing houses, but is available free through Project Gutenberg or other websites.

== Characters ==
In order of appearance:

- Mrs. Agnes Roberts, a new mother who is on her way to Boston to visit her husband and brother. Traveling with her are her baby son and her dear Aunt Mary.
- Aunt Mary, the aunt of Mrs. Roberts, a very proud old woman.
- The Porter
- Angry Voices, the voices of other passengers, who routinely interject their usually critical opinions into the main dialogue. The exact speakers of these angry voices are never revealed.
- The Californian, a shaggy-headed and bearded man who encounters Mrs. Roberts and defends her vehemently when she is heckled by other passengers.
- The Man in the Upper Berth, a voice with whom the Californian engages in a verbal debate with the Californian over Mrs. Roberts's incessant nighttime conversation.
- Mr. Edward Roberts, the husband of Mrs. Roberts. He boards the train at Worcester in an attempt to surprise his wife before Boston.
- The Conductor
- Willis Campbell, Mrs. Roberts's brother, a San Francisco resident. He boards the train early at Framingham, as he was visiting friends there and was ahead of schedule. Some discussion occurs between Mr. and Mrs. Roberts regarding his identity, but eventually he is positively identified as Mrs. Roberts's brother.

== Plot ==
This story begins with Mrs. Roberts, her baby son, and her Aunt Mary headed Westbound on the Boston and Albany Railroad. They are on their way to meet Mrs. Roberts' husband and brother in Boston. Mrs. Roberts has not seen her brother in twelve years, and is nervous about how he will react to seeing her. In the time since they last saw each other, she has married and birthed a child, and has heard little from her brother except for infrequent telegraphs. The porter informs Mrs. Roberts and her aunt that the berths are now ready for them to sleep in, but the conversation continues. Mrs. Roberts worries that her husband Edward will not receive Willis well, or vice versa, because Willis is a Californian and Edward has never encountered one before. Mrs. Roberts laments that her life would be a wreck if her husband and brother do not get along nicely, and states "I do hope they're sitting down to a hot supper."

A voice from an adjacent berth interjects and sarcastically tells Mrs. Roberts to be quiet. She acquiesces for a moment, but then reverts to conversation, stating how they must go to bed. Aunt Mary insists that Mrs. Roberts and the child take the bottom bunk, because she is afraid that the child will roll off of the top bunk and injure himself. She calls the porter over to help her into the upper berth, and after successfully entering the berth, exchanges "good-night" with Mrs. Roberts.

After a few minutes, Mrs. Roberts rekindles the conversation, and expresses her concern regarding the safety of the train on which they're riding. Her aunt reassures her that the road is safe, and that the train has implemented safety measures to prevent accidents. Mrs. Roberts then goes on to discuss where her Aunt left the drinking glass in their luggage, until she is interrupted by a man from the next berth. This man politely requests silence from Mrs. Roberts, citing that he has come straight through from San Francisco and would very much like some rest. Mrs. Roberts responds apologetically, but starts conversing with this man, inquiring about California, her brother Willis, and if he has ever met his acquaintance. Midway through their conversation, a man in the upper berth sarcastically interjects and asks for quiet. The Californian takes offense to the man's tone towards Mrs. Roberts, and the two get into a verbal argument over it. Eventually, the Californian gets the man in the upper berth to back down ("You beg that lady's pardon, or I'll have you out of there before you know yourself!"). Part I ends with the Californian and Mrs. Roberts finally going to bed, with only the sounds of Aunt Mary's snoring audible.

Part II begins with Edward boarding the train at Worcester. After confirming the train's identity with the porter, Mr. Roberts attempts to search for his wife. Of course, he does not know which berth houses his wife, and he tries to jog the porter's memory with details about his wife and her traveling companions. The conductor joins the conversation, and finally all decide to wait until morning to search for Mr. Roberts's wife, when all the passengers will be awake. Edward settles into a seat on the train, and noticies what appears to be his wife's bonnet hanging from a hook next to one of the berths. The porter says that a man is in that berth, but convinced by the bonnet, Edward decides to take a chance and enter the berth, bribing the porter to allow him to do so.

Of course, the berth that Edward enters is the berth of the Californian, who is not pleased that someone has again interrupted his slumber. The Californian confronts Mr. Roberts, who attempts to talk his way out of the situation. Mrs. Roberts wakes up from this noise, and comes to her husband's side. The conductor comes to see what all the fuss is about, and it is the Californian who confesses to making the noise. The conductor decides that his problem with the Californian is not worth a confrontation. ("[If I had a problem], I'd get the biggest brakeman to do it for me.") Mr. Edwards apologizes to the Californian for waking him, and invites him to call on them whenever he pleases.

The Californian returns to his berth, and Mrs. Roberts fills her husband in on the events of the sleeping car thus far. She realizes she has neglected the child during this brief kerfuffle, and dashes back to her berth to check on him. Mrs. Roberts selects the wrong berth, and again interrupts the Californian's sleep. She explains that she was looking for her child, and the Californian decides to help the Roberts' look for their baby son. The Californian finds Mrs. Roberts's berth on his first attempt, and Mrs. Roberts shrieks with excitement. Again, the Californian returns to his berth.

However, Mrs. Roberts remains awake. She comes to the sudden and unrelenting realization that the Californian is in fact her brother Willis. ("It accounts for his being so polite and kind to me through all [of this].") Obsessed and sincere in her conviction of this thought, she and her husband yet again interrupt the sleep of the Californian, pulling open he curtains and accusing him of being her brother. The Californian jokingly rejects this premise, and assures them that he most certainly is not Willis Campbell. Disappointed and deeply sorry for again interrupting his sleep, Mr. and Mrs. Roberts return to their berth. Thus ends Part II.

Part III begins with a passenger boarding the train the next day. The porter shows this gentleman to a seat across from where the Roberts' sit. Mrs. Roberts notices the name on the bag says "Willis Campbell, San Francisco." Although this evidence should be plenty for Mrs. Roberts to immediately confront this stranger about his identity, she hesitates, and is worried that she will further humiliate herself if this person is not her brother. Eventually, she gathers the courage to ask him, and the two discover that they are indeed brother and sister. Mrs. Roberts fills in her brother on the past antics of the journey in the sleeping car, and upon hearing the description of the Californian, is convinced that he is Tom Goodall, an old acquaintance of his. However, the Californian is named Abram Sawyer, and again he has woken up for frivolous purposes.

As the train is quickly approaching Boston, Mr. Roberts suggests that Aunt Mary be woken up so that she may prepare for arrival. Aunt Mary is informed that both Edward and Willis have boarded the sleeping car overnight, and meets the acquaintance of the Californian. Upon hearing his name, Aunt Mary is convinced that she knows him as the daughter of her old friend Kate Harris. Clearly, this accusation is ridiculous, and the voices of the other sleeping car passengers make some jokes about it. The play ends with Aunt Mary requesting for the porter to help her down from the upper berth.

== Analysis, themes, and motifs ==
Analysis:

This play is a farce, revolving around the absurdity of mistaken identity. The humor in this play lies in this constant mistaken identity, in the neurosis of Mrs. Roberts, in the interjections from the other passengers, and in the heartbreaking inability of the Californian to sleep.

The person for whom identity is most frequently mistaken is the Californian, who frequently bears the brunt of false identity accusations. Mrs. Roberts, Willis, and Aunt Mary all claim to know the Californian, but none of them do, of course. The Californian himself seems to realize the humor in this, and states "I've been a baby twice, and I've been a man's wife once, and once I've been a long-lost brother."

The neurosis of Mrs. Roberts is another point of humor. She frequently states "good-night" to Aunt Mary in part I, but always revives the conversation by expressing some sort of worry, insecurity, or anxiety. Mrs. Roberts expresses initially her worry about how her brother and husband will interact, and needs constant reassurance from her aunt to calm down. Minutes later, she is concerned about the safety of the train, whose creaking noises stir worry about her safety and the safety of her baby son. Aunt Mary again alleviates her stress by citing all of the safety measures the railroad has implemented (i.e. the well-managed road, air-brake, and Miller platform). After this anxiety passes, Mrs. Roberts frets about where the water glass is packed in the luggage, and decides to talk herself through its retrieval. The intense neurosis of Mrs. Roberts is comically pathetic, and quite extreme. Effortlessly moving from one point of anxiety to the next, Mrs. Roberts creates a feeling of persistent neurosis for the reader, who must simply laugh at the woeful worry.

The interjections from the other passengers are also quite comedic. Their comments, largely sarcastic and witty, provide a more typical and colloquial humor to the play than the humor of ridiculousness. The sarcasm of the man in the upper berth for instance, exemplifies this comedy: "I could lie here and listen to it all night; but there are invalids in some of these berths, and perhaps on their account it will be as well to defer everything till the morning." Furthermore, interjections from other passengers such as "Train robbers! Throw up your hands! Tell the express-messenger to bring his safe!" add more blatantly sarcastic humor to the story.

The inability of the Californian to sleep is humorous in its own right, especially since the first words that the Californian speaks are a sincere appeal to Mrs. Roberts for silence. The Californian has not slept in a while, and it appears that his only priority is catching up on his sleep. This sincere desire for sleep makes the constant awakening of the Californian even more heartbreakingly humorous. At one point he is awakened (quite startlingly) twice in a row, first by Mr. Roberts and then by Mrs. Roberts, who somehow mistakes the Californian's berth for the berth she emerged from seconds prior. One starts to empathize with the Californian, and all one can do when he is interrupted time and time again is to chuckle.

Also, there is comedic value in the irony of the title. The play is called The Sleeping Car, yet very little sleep is to be found for those on it.

Furthermore, this play exemplifies William Dean Howells's dedication to literary realism. Howells was quite weary about romanticism, and thought it to be a cause of the American Civil War. Thus, he focused on authenticity, and practiced fidelity to representing ordinary people who were, in many instances, his contemporaries. This passion for authentic representation certainly did not earn Howells the title of being the most exciting author of his time, and rather added to his reputation for mundane and ordinary tales.

The Sleeping Car is certainly no exception to the Howellsian plot. In this play there is only one setting, and the action all revolves around mistaken identity. Other than a few misunderstandings, nothing of importance or excitement happens in this book. The characters begin on a sleeping car, have some slight misunderstandings, meet some new people, and end (rather undeveloped) right where they began, on the same sleeping car. Furthermore, the lack of a narrator in this play means that the reader objectively receives the plot, and is not subject to bias or interpretation of a third party.

Howells was known for his deep anxiety about industrialism and finance, and the growth of the urban metropolis. This anxiety is exemplified in his other works, such as The Rise of Silas Lapham, but is certainly also visible in The Sleeping Car. The characters in this play, with the exception of the Californian, all share an intimate bond. They are connected through family, and presumably they hail from similar places. However, with the urbanization and growth of America, people lose their intimacy with one another, creating confusion. In The Sleeping Car, Mrs. Roberts is from a different part of America than her brother Willis and the Californian. Mrs. Roberts's utter confusion about the true identity of these two men perfectly exemplifies Howells's point about the rise of the metropolis creating obfuscation.

Themes and motifs:

- Differences between the American West (specifically California) and Northeast

Mrs. Roberts worries about her husband not getting along with her brother, a californian. Moreover, the Californian in the play encounters the absurdity and restlessness of Northeastern America.

- Mistaken identity

Examples of this theme are abundant, from Mrs. Roberts thinking the Californian is her brother to Aunt Mary thinking the Californian is the daughter of a woman she knew.

- Beginning of the metropolis

People don't know each other as intimately as they do in small, rural towns, and this mass population creates identity uncertainty.

- Impulsiveness

This theme is exemplified most obviously by Mrs. Roberts, who states her mind at will and simply will not shut up. She barges into other people's berths and typically acts prior to thinking.

== Critical reception ==
Due to the widespread influence of William Dean Howells during the late 1800s, this book was most likely fairly well read by people of that time, although probably not as widely read as other works of his. There is no information on sales of the book.

In a May 1883 issue of The Atlantic, a reviewer states the following about The Sleeping Car.

"Mr. Howell's farce of The Sleeping Car (Osgood), comes very near being the most delightful thing he has written. The humor and ingenuity of this piece are rare both in kind and degree."

In an August 1889 issue of The Atlantic, the author expresses that The Sleeping Car and Howells's other farces have entertained readers, who have in general responded quite positively to it.

The Sleeping Car is also referenced in a submission to the editor in the February 1886 version of Harper's Magazine, indicating that this work indeed reached a widespread audience, gaining popularity (or at least some readership), amongst the readers of both Harper's Magazine and The Atlantic.

There is no evidence in modern online journals or databases to suggest that these views regarding The Sleeping Car have changed much, if at all, since the late 1800s.
