= Lycidas =

Elegiac poem written by John Milton

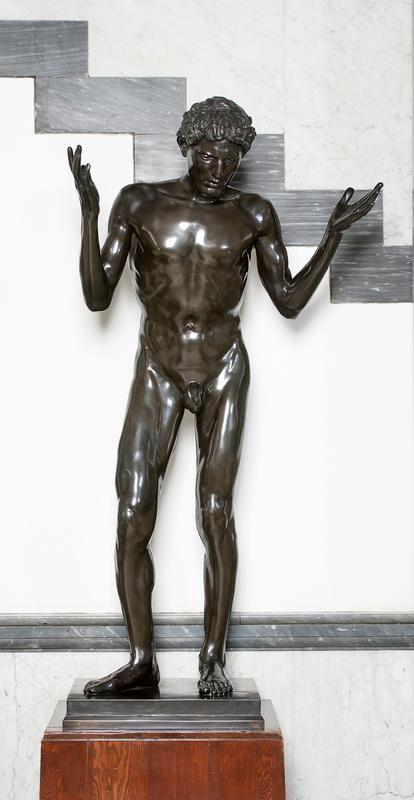
Lycidas by James Havard Thomas, bronze cast in collections of Aberdeen Art Gallery and Tate Britain

"Lycidas" (/ˈlɪsɪdəs/) is a poem by John Milton, written in 1637 as a pastoral elegy. It first appeared in a 1638 collection of elegies, Justa Edouardo King Naufrago, dedicated to the memory of Edward King, a friend of Milton at Cambridge who drowned when his ship sank in the Irish Sea off the coast of Wales in August 1637. The poem is 193 lines in length and is irregularly rhymed. Many of the other poems in the compilation are in Greek and Latin, but "Lycidas" is one of the poems written in English. Milton republished the poem in 1645.

== History of the name Lycidas ==
Herodotus in his Book IX (written in the 5th century BC) mentions an Athenian councilor in Salamis, "a man named Lycidas" (Λυκίδας), who proposed to his fellow citizens that they submit to a compromise offered by their enemy, Persian King Xerxes I, with whom they were at war. Suspected of collusion with the enemy for suggesting the compromise, Lycidas was stoned to death by "those in the council and those outside, [who] were so enraged.... [W]ith all the uproar in Salamis over Lycidas, the Athenian women soon found out what had happened; whereupon, without a word from the men, they got together, and, each one urging on her neighbor and taking her along with the crowd, flocked to Lycidas' house and stoned his wife and children."

The name later occurs in Theocritus's Idylls, where Lycidas is most prominently a poet-goatherd encountered on the trip of "Idyll vii." The name appears several times in Virgil and is a typically Doric shepherd's name, appropriate for the pastoral mode. A Lycidas appears in Ovid's Metamorphoses as a centaur.

Lycidas also occurs in Lucan's Pharsalia, where in iii.636 a sailor named Lycidas is ripped by an iron hook from the deck of a ship.

== "Lycidas" as pastoral elegy ==
By naming Edward King "Lycidas," Milton follows "the tradition of memorializing a loved one through Pastoral poetry, a practice that may be traced from ancient Greek Sicily through Roman culture and into the Christian Middle Ages and early Renaissance." Milton describes King as "selfless," even though he was of the clergy – a statement both bold and, at the time, controversial among lay people: "Through allegory, the speaker accuses God of unjustly punishing the young, selfless King, whose premature death ended a career that would have unfolded in stark contrast to the majority of the ministers and bishops of the Church of England, whom the speaker condemns as depraved, materialistic, and selfish."

Authors and poets in the Renaissance used the pastoral mode in order to represent an ideal of life in a simple, rural landscape. Literary critics have emphasized the artificial character of pastoral nature: "The pastoral was in its very origin a sort of toy, literature of make-believe." Milton himself "recognized the pastoral as one of the natural modes of literary expression," employing it throughout "Lycidas" in order to achieve a strange juxtaposition between death and the remembrance of a loved one.

The poem itself begins with a pastoral image of laurels and myrtles, "symbols of poetic fame; as their berries are not yet ripe, the poet is not yet ready to take up his pen". However, the speaker is so filled with sorrow for the death of Lycidas that he finally begins to write an elegy. "Yet the untimely death of young Lycidas requires equally untimely verses from the poet. Invoking the muses of poetic inspiration, the shepherd-poet takes up the task, partly, he says, in hope that his own death will not go unlamented." The speaker continues by recalling the life of the young shepherds together "in the 'pastures' of Cambridge." Milton uses the pastoral idiom to allegorize experiences he and King shared as fellow students at Christ's College, Cambridge. The university is represented as the "self-same hill" upon which the speaker and Lycidas were "nurst"; their studies are likened to the shepherds' work of "dr[iving] a field" and "Batt’ning… flocks"; classmates are "Rough satyrs" and "fauns with clov’n heel" and the dramatic and comedic pastimes they pursued are "Rural ditties… / Temper’ed to th' oaten flute"; a Cambridge professor is "old Damoetas [who] lov’d to hear our song". The poet then notes the "'heavy change' suffered by nature now that Lycidas is gone—a ‘pathetic fallacy’ in which the willows, hazel groves, woods, and caves lament Lycidas's death." In the next section of the poem, "The shepherd-poet reflects… that thoughts of how Lycidas might have been saved are futile… turning from lamenting Lycidas’s death to lamenting the futility of all human labor." This section is followed by an interruption in the swain's monologue by the voice of Phoebus, "the sun-god, an image drawn out of the mythology of classical Roman poetry, [who] replies that fame is not mortal but eternal, witnessed by Jove (God) himself on judgment day." At the end of the poem, King/Lycidas appears as a resurrected figure, being delivered, through the resurrecting power of Christ, by the waters that lead to his death: "Burnished by the sun's rays at dawn, King resplendently ascends heavenward to his eternal reward."

Although on its surface "Lycidas" reads like a straightforward pastoral elegy, a closer reading reveals its complexity. "Lycidas" has been called "'probably the most perfect piece of pure literature in existence…’ [employing] patterns of structure, prosody, and imagery to maintain a dynamic coherence. The syntax of the poem is full of 'impertinent auxiliary assertions' that contribute valuably to the experience of the poem." The piece itself is remarkably dynamic, enabling many different styles and patterns to overlap, so that "the loose ends of any one pattern disappear into the interweavings of the others."

"Lycidas" also has its detractors, including 18th-century literary critic and polymath Samuel Johnson, who infamously called the pastoral form "easy, vulgar, and therefore disgusting," and said of Milton's elegy:

It is not to be considered as the effusion of real passion; for passion runs not after remote allusions and obscure opinions. Passion plucks no berries from the myrtle and ivy, nor calls upon Arethuse and Mincius, nor tells of rough satyrs and fauns with cloven heel. Where there is leisure for fiction there is little grief.

Johnson was reacting to what he saw as the irrelevance of the pastoral idiom in Milton's age and his own, and to its ineffectiveness at conveying genuine emotion. Johnson said that conventional pastoral images—for instance, the representation of the speaker and the deceased as shepherds—were "long ago exhausted," and so improbable that they "always forc[e] dissatisfaction on the mind." Johnson also criticized the blending of Christian and pagan images and themes in "Lycidas," which he saw as the poem's "grosser fault." He said "Lycidas" positions the "trifling fictions" of "heathen deities—Jove and Phoebus, Neptune and Æolus" alongside "the most awful and sacred truths, such as ought never to be polluted with such irreverend combinations.

Johnson concluded: "Surely no man could have fancied that he read Lycidas with pleasure had he not known its author."

== The Uncouth Swain ==
Though commonly considered to be a monody, "Lycidas" in fact features two distinct voices, the first of which belongs to the uncouth swain (or shepherd). The work opens with the swain, who finds himself grieving for the death of his friend, Lycidas, in an idyllic pastoral world. In his article entitled "Belief and Disbelief in Lycidas," Lawrence W. Hyman states that the swain is experiencing a "loss of faith in a world order that allows death to strike a young man." Similarly, Lauren Shohet asserts that the swain is projecting his grief upon the classical images of the pastoral setting at this point in the elegy.

Throughout the poem, the swain uses both Christian and Pagan concepts, and mentally locates Lycidas' body in both settings, according to Russel Fraser. Examples of this are the mention of Death as an animate being, the "Sisters of the Sacred Well," Orpheus, the blind Fury that struck Lycidas down, and the scene in which Lycidas is imagined to have become a regional deity (a "genius of the shore") after drowning. Since Lycidas, like King, drowned, there is no body to be found, and the absence of the corpse is of great concern to the swain.

Ultimately, the swain's grief and loss of faith are conquered by a "belief in immortality." Many scholars have pointed out that there is very little logical basis within the poem for this conclusion, but that a reasonable process is not necessary for "Lycidas" to be effective. Fraser will argue that Milton's voice intrudes briefly upon the swain's to tell a crowd of fellow swains that Lycidas is not in fact dead (here one sees belief in immortality). This knowledge is inconsistent with the speaker's "uncouth" character.

== The Pilot ==
Upon entering the poem at line 109, the voice of the "Pilot of the Galilean lake," generally believed to represent St. Peter, serves as a judge, condemning the multitude of unworthy members found among the clergy of the Church of England. Similarly, St. Peter fills the position of Old Testament prophet when he speaks of the clergy's "moral decay" and the grave consequences of their leadership. He then compares these immoral church leaders to wolves among sheep and warns of the "two-handed engine". According to E. S. de Beer, this "two-handed engine" is thought to be a powerful weapon and an allusion to a portion of the Book of Zechariah.

Concerning St. Peter's role as a "prophet," the term is meant in the Biblical sense, de Beer claims, and not in the more modern sense of the word. Since Biblical prophets more often served as God's messengers than as seers, de Beer states that Milton was not attempting to foretell the likely future of the church via St. Peter.

De Beer continues on to note that St. Peter's appearance in "Lycidas" is likely unrelated to his position as head of the Roman Catholic Church. Neither was St. Peter ascribed any particular position within the Church of England. Instead, de Beer argues that St. Peter appears simply as an apostolic authority, through whom Milton might express his frustration with unworthy members of the English clergy. Fraser also agrees that St. Peter, indeed, serves as a vehicle for Milton's voice to enter the poem.

The Church was so thrown off by the poem that they banned it for nearly twenty years after Milton's death.

== The conclusion ==
Several interpretations of the ending have been proposed. Jonathan Post claims the poem ends with a sort of retrospective picture of the poet having "sung" the poem into being. According to critic Lauren Shohet, Lycidas is transcendently leaving the earth, becoming immortal, rising from the pastoral plane in which he is too involved or tangled from the objects that made him. She claims that "he is diffused into, and animates, the last location of his corpse—his experience of body-as-object… neither fully immanent (since his body is lost) nor fully transcendent (since he remains on earth)."

With an ambiguous ending, the poem does not just end with a death, but instead, it just begins. The monody clearly ends with a death and an absolute end but also moves forward and comes full circle because it takes a look back at the pastoral world left behind making the ambivalence of the end a mixture of creation and destruction. Nonetheless "thy large recompense" also has a double meaning. As Paul Alpers states, Lycidas' gratitude in heaven is a payment for his loss. The word "thy" is both an object and mediator of "large recompense." Thus, the meaning also maintains the literal meaning which is that of a sacred higher being or the pagan genius.

The final lines of the poem:

And now the Sun had stretch'd out all the hills,
And now was dropt into the Western bay;
At last he rose, and twitch'd his Mantle blew:
To morrow to fresh Woods, and Pastures new

may refer to Milton's imminent departure to Italy, and they are reminiscent of the end of Virgil's 10th Eclogue,

Surgamus; solet esse gravis cantantibus umbra; iuniperi gravis umbra; nocent et frugibus umbrae. Ite domum saturae, venit Hesperus, ite capellae.	Come, let us rise: the shade is wont to be baneful to singers; baneful is the shade cast by the juniper, crops sicken too in shade. Now homeward, having fed your fill — eve's star is rising – go, my she-goats, go.

== Justa Edouardo King Naufrago ==
"Lycidas" was originally published in a poetic miscellany, Justa Edouardo King Naufrago (1638), alongside thirty-five other poems elegizing the death of Edward King. Collected at Cambridge, most of the poems were written by academics at the university who were committed to the conservative church politics of Archbishop Laud. Among the poets were John Cleveland, Joseph Beaumont, and Henry More. Milton, on the other hand, who reported that he had been "Church-outed by the prelates," had failed to achieve a position at Cambridge after his graduation, and his religious views were becoming more radical. The style and form of his poem also strongly contrasts from the other texts in the collection. While most of the poetry adopts a baroque aesthetic linked to the Laudian ceremonialism that was in vogue in the 1630s, Milton wrote "Lycidas" in the outmoded pastoral style. "Lycidas" may actually be satirizing the poetic work featured throughout the Justa Edouardo King Naufrago.

== 1645 reprint ==
Milton republished the poem in his 1645 collection Poems of Mr. John Milton. To this version is added a brief prose preface:

In this MONODY the Author bewails a learned Friend, unfortunately drowned in his passage from Chester on the Irish seas, 1637. And by occasion foretells the ruin of our corrupted clergy, then in their height.

When Milton published this version, in 1645, the Long Parliament, to which Milton held allegiance, was in power; thus Milton could add the prophetic note—in hindsight—about the destruction of the "corrupted clergy," the "blind mouths" (119) of the poem.

== Influence ==
The poem was exceedingly popular. It was hailed as Milton's best poem, and by some as the greatest lyrical poem in the English language. Yet it was detested for its artificiality by Samuel Johnson, who found "the diction is harsh, the rhymes uncertain, and the numbers unpleasing" and complained that "in this poem there is no nature, for there is no truth; there is no art, for there is nothing new."

A line from the poem inspired the title and themes in Stops of Various Quills, an 1895 poetry collection by William Dean Howells. Similarly, it is from a line in "Lycidas" that Thomas Wolfe took the name of his novel Look Homeward, Angel:

Look homeward Angel now, and melt with ruth:
And, O ye Dolphins', waft the hapless youth. (163–164)

The title of Howard Spring's 1940 political novel Fame is the Spur takes its title from the poem, as does The Sheep Look Up by John Brunner which is taken from line 125.

The title of the short story "Wash Far Away" by John Berryman from the collection Freedom of the Poet is also taken from this poem:

Ay me! Whilst thee the shores and sounding Seas
Wash far away, where ere thy bones are hurld, (154–155)

The song "The Alphabet Business Concern (Home of Fadeless Splendour)", from the album Heaven Born and Ever Bright (1992) by Cardiacs, contains the lines:

Comes the blind Fury with th'abhorred shears And slits the thin spun life. (75–76)

== See also ==
- 1637 in poetry, the year the poem was written
- 1638 in poetry, the year the poem was published
