= A Hazard of New Fortunes =

1889 novel by William Dean Howells

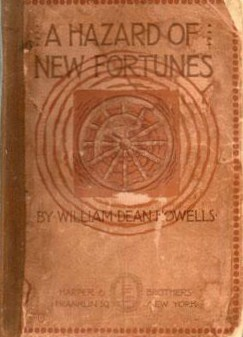
- 1890 Harper & Brothers edition
- Author: William Dean Howells
- Language: English
- Genre: Literary realism
- Publication date: 1889
- Publication place: United States
- Media type: Print (Hardcover
- Pages: 558 (first edition)

A Hazard of New Fortunes is a novel by William Dean Howells published in 1889.

== Characters ==
- Basil March – Businessman from Boston who moves to New York City to start a new periodical.
- Isabel March – Wife of Basil March who follows him to New York City
- Fulkerson – Hopeful and charismatic entrepreneur who claims to originate the idea of Every Other Week.
- Colonel Woodburn – Wealthy Virginia resident who was a colonel for the Confederacy in the American Civil War. He believes slavery could work if they made the system more efficient.
- Berthold Lindau – German-born member of the lower class. Highly educated despite his poverty, he fought for the Union in the Civil War and lost his hand. He advocates for workers' rights and socialism.
- Mr. Dryfoos – Rich Midwesterner who made his money on natural gas. He is anti-union and bankrolls Every Other Week as a way to encourage his son to go into business.
- Conrad Dryfoos – The son of Mr. Dryfoos. He works at Every Other Week because of his father, who is trying to persuade him to become a businessman instead of an Episcopalian priest. He enjoys helping those who are less fortunate.
- Angus Beaton – An artist for Every Other Week. He is in love with Alma Leighton.
- Alma Leighton – A young aspiring artist who contributes drawings to Every Other Week.
- Margaret Vance – A New York society girl who leads a non-traditional life engaging in charity work and, by the end of the book, becomes an Episcopalian nun. Plays banjo.

== Plot summary ==
The title A Hazard of New Fortunes is a reference to William Shakespeare's King John. King John portrays the themes of uncertainty, change, and violence, all of which are also important to A Hazard of New Fortunes.

The book, set in late 19th-century New York City, tells the story of Basil March, an affable literary man who provides the main perspective throughout the story. March takes a senior job at a New York magazine and eventually finds himself in the middle of a fierce dispute between his beloved old mentor and the magazine's wealthy owner.

At the beginning of the book, March is residing in Boston with his wife and children. Then he is persuaded by his entrepreneurial friend Fulkerson to move to New York to help him start a new magazine, where the writers benefit from a primitive form of profit sharing. After some deliberation, the Marches move to New York and begin a rather extensive search for a perfect apartment. After many exhausting weeks of searching, Basil finally settles on an apartment full of what he and his wife refer to as "gimcrackery" — trinkets and decorations that do not appeal to their upper-middle-class tastes. While in New York, March renews the acquaintance of Berthold Lindau, a German-born intellectual who taught March the German language decades earlier. A strong abolitionist, Lindau fought in the American Civil War and lost a hand. He is now an elderly, impoverished widower. Though Lindau is still as warm-hearted and idealistic as ever, his socialist views often cause him to speak bitterly about what America has become under capitalism. March worries that people who do not understand the old man will misjudge him as unpatriotic or violent.

Work at the new magazine, titled Every Other Week begins. The magazine is bankrolled by a millionaire named Dryfoos, who became wealthy after discovering natural gas on his farm in the Midwest, and who is now making money on Wall Street. Dryfoos gives his unworldly son, Conrad, the job of business manager for the magazine in order to try to dissuade him from becoming an Episcopalian priest. An artist by the name of Angus Beaton, an old friend of Fulkerson's, is chosen to head the art department. Beaton chooses Alma Leighton, for whom he has feelings, to illustrate the cover of the first issue. March recruits Lindau, who knows several languages, to translate articles from Europe for the magazine, giving him a modest income. Colonel Woodburn, a wealthy Southerner, and his daughter move to New York and become involved with the magazine when their social circle connects them with Alma Leighton; they board with her and her mother. Fulkerson decides that he would like to publish some of Colonel Woodburn's pro-slavery writings in Every Other Week, because he believes they would create controversy and sell more copies of the new magazine.

At a banquet for people associated with the magazine, the political views of Dryfoos the capitalist, Lindau the socialist, and Colonel Woodburn the pro-slavery advocate clash. Though Lindau has no use for Woodburn, he is even more fierce in his comments about Dryfoos the capitalist, and is not mollified by the millionaire's recollections of having avoided service in the war while paying for other men to fight. Lindau switches to German to express to March how much he loathes Dryfoos, because he thinks no one else at the table knows the language. Later it is revealed that Dryfoos (of Pennsylvania-Dutch background) speaks German, and he was insulted by Lindau's comments. Dryfoos demands that the magazine fire Lindau, an ultimatum that briefly causes a rift between Fulkerson and March, but then Lindau visits March and dramatically quits, returning some of the money he has already earned.

In the end of the book, the New York City streetcar drivers strike. The strike, similar to the Haymarket affair, turns into a riot. Conrad Dryfoos, already a humanitarian helping the poor and working class, is charmed by the lovely Margaret Vance, who shares his values of charity. She encourages Conrad to try to end the strike by telling all sides to desist. While attempting to stop a policeman from beating the aged and disabled Lindau, Conrad is fatally shot. March emerges from a streetcar to see the fallen men lying on the street next to each other. Dryfoos mourns the loss of his son. After further amputation of his already disabled arm, Lindau dies with Margaret Vance at his side.

In a gesture to honor the kindness of his late son, Dryfoos holds the funeral of his former antagonist Lindau in his own house. The grieving tycoon soon sells the magazine to Fulkerson and March for an extremely low price and takes his remaining family to Europe. Fulkerson moves into the apartment above the magazine with his new wife, Colonel Woodburn's daughter. The Marches pass Margaret Vance on the street; she has become an Episcopalian nun.

== Publication history and response ==
A Hazard of New Fortunes was first released as a serial in Harper's Weekly between March 23 and November 16, 1889. It was first published in book form by Harper & Bros. in 1890, and the book was well-received for its portrayal of social injustice. Considered by many to be his best work, the novel is also considered to be the first novel to portray New York City. One contemporary review for the New York Times noted, "there is nothing lost of the vivacity that makes Mr. Howells's novels come like holidays among the novel-reading public" and, though generally praising, notes that the social questions are "left necessarily unresolved".

Some argue that the novel was the first of three Howells wrote with Socialist and Utopian ideals in mind: The Quality of Mercy in 1892, and An Imperative Duty in 1893. In this novel, although Howells briefly discusses the American Civil War, he primarily deals with issues of post-war "Gilded Age" America, like labor disputes, the rise of the self-made millionaire, the growth of urban America, the influx of immigrants, and other industrial-era problems. Many critics consider A Hazard of New Fortunes to be one of Howells' most important examples of American literary Realism because he portrays a variety of people from different backgrounds.
