= The Flight of Pony Baker =

Short story by William Dean Howells

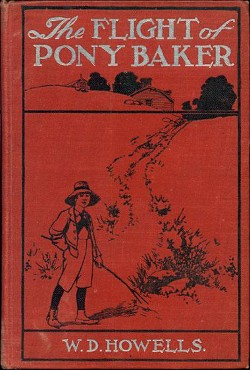
First edition, 1902

The Flight of Pony Baker is a novel for children, one of the many stories written by William Dean Howells. It was published by Harper and Brothers in 1902 in New York, New York. It tells the story of a young boy named Pony Baker who, throughout the book, attempts to run away from his home where he lives with his mother, father, and five sisters. The setting of the story is "fifty years ago" in the Boy's Town of Ohio, the state where Howells was born and raised.

== Plot summary ==
=== Pony's Mother, and Why He Had the Right to Run Off ===
The story begins with Frank Baker, who is known as "Pony" after one of the boys in Boy's Town calls him by that name, so that he could be distinguished from his cousin Frank Baker. Pony lives in the Boy's Town with his mother, father, and five sisters, whom his mother always wants him to play with. Pony's mother is very overprotective of Pony, which is the root of his annoyance with her.

=== The Right That Pony Had to Run Off, From the Way His Father Acted ===
Pony's father is fairly strict with him, but Pony thinks that is because his mother influenced him. One day however, Pony almost loses all his patience after his father reacts badly to Pony being lowered from third reader to second reader at school. That morning in class, Pony is asked by his teacher to read, and he chooses to read poorly because of heat and laziness. His performance causes the teacher to push him down to the second reader. Pony leaves school before class is over, but when he reaches home, his father tells him to go back. Pony heads back to school that afternoon with a plan to run away as soon as school is over. At recess the boys hear word of Pony's plan to run away that night. The boys at school all want to help, and an older boy named Jim Leonard suggests that Pony go with the Indians and that the Indians would adopt him into their tribe. Jim offers to find out if there are any Indians living nearer that the reservation that is about 100 miles away from the Boy's Town.

=== Jim Leonard's Hair-Breadth Escape ===
Jim Leonard lives with his mother near the river in a log cabin with a stable that is close to the water. One year in the spring, a freshet comes about that is the worse anyone can remember. Jim watches the bridge while the water rises, and by the time he leaves it is night. He does not want to go home, because his mother might beat him for being out so late. He decides to go to sleep stable-loft to avoid his mother. Jim wakes up to the daylight and realizes that the flood has torn the stable apart and left him floating on the roof in the water. The current quickly pulls Jim, the roof, and a rat that is on the roof out into the middle of the river where he begins to yell for help at the houses on the shore. He continues to yell as the bridge nears, until the firemen arrive. At this point, Jim decides to name the rat Bolivar, and that he will save it and keep it as a pet. Fireman Blue Bob is able to save Jim Leonard, but the rat falls into the water. The fireman later says that he never saw the rat, and the townspeople believe the story of the rat to be made up.

=== The Scrape That Jim Leonard Got the Boys Into ===
Late that summer, Jim tells Pony Baker and the boys that he knows of a watermelon patch that the owner had no use for, and the boys demand to know where it is. Jim tells them that the patch belongs to Bunty Williams and dares the boys to come with him to get melons. The boys set off with Jim on a trip to the watermelon patch. On the way through the river and the woods, Jim begins to hesitate. He begins to complain of a toothache, but the boys encourage him to keep going. Finally, Jim rushes ahead of the boys to the large patch. The boys praise Jim for leading them to the patch, but he does not eat any melons and continues to complain of a toothache. While the boys break open the melons, Pony also does not eat any because he thinks it is wrong. Pony and Jim stand off to the side while they watch the rest of the boys enjoy themselves.

Pony thinks he sees someone come out of Bunty Williams' house, in the distance, with a hoe in their hand and a dog. When Jim sees, he shrieks that it is Bunty with a dog and a gun. The boys immediately run into the woods to escape Bunty. The boys cross the river, but Jim Leonard is missing. The boys begin to brag about what they would have done if Bunty had caught them and what they would do to Jim if he were with them. Pony is scared that the boys would hurt Jim Leonard if they found him, so he leaves the boys while they are trying to start a fire to dry their clothes. Pony climbs the riverbank and finds Jim hiding in a hole watching the other boys. Jim is crying and complaining of his toothache. He is afraid that if he goes home he will get beaten by his mother.

Jim and Pony eat together and relax. As Jim begins to tell stories of Indians, Pony wonders why Bunty would have chased them if he had given up the watermelon patch, but never gets the chance to ask Jim. Pony begins to feel very sick and asks Jim to help him get home. Jim asks Pony not to tell his parents of what happened today and Pony agrees. Pony's mother finds out what happened at the watermelon patch and how Jim Leonard started the whole thing. At the end of the chapter, Pony's mother expresses her dislike for Jim and his escapades.

=== About Running Away to the Indian Reservation on a Canal-Boat, and How the Plan Failed ===
As much as his mother hated Jim Leonard, Pony likes Jim and believes everything Jim says. Jim finds out that the closest reservation is near Lake Erie and that the best way to get there was by canal-boat. Pony does not want to live there for long, he is scared that he would forget his parents, but doesn't tell Jim for fear of being made fun of. The next day at school, everyone hears how Pony is planning to run away on a canal-boat to see the Indians. The boys tell Pony that he should use Piccolo Wright's father's boat to cross the lake. They are scheming near the boat, when they hear Piccolo's father yelling. They quickly run scatter and abandon their plans.

=== How the Indians Came to the Boy's Town and Jim Leonard Acted the Coward ===
A group of Indians come through the Boy's Town while being relocated by the government. The boys are excited by the arrival of the Indians and Jim tries to persuade Pony to run away with them. Pony does not want to tell Jim that he has given up the idea of running away. Jim continues persuading Pony to go with the Indians until an arrow skims Jim's foot. Pony helps Jim home and decides against running away with the Indians and fully gives up the idea of running away. He has a great Fourth of July and begins to think about his cousin Frank's story about the Fourth of July a year before.

=== How Frank Baker Spent The Fourth at Pawpaw Bottom, and Saw the Fourth of July Boy ===
Jake Milrace rides up to Frank and invites him to his friend Dave's house for Fourth of July. His mother gives him permission and the two leave to go to Dave's house. Dave is out in the pasture hauling rails and the boys help him during the heat of the day. After dinner and work, the three boys head to the swimming hole in the creek. On the way to the swimming hole, they are blinded by a light and see a boy in a cornfield. That afternoon they see the boy several more times, but only in fleeting glances. After much play Frank and Jake head back to the Boy's Town. When they get to Frank's house, Frank's mother feeds them, and the two tell their stories. Frank and Pony tell their story about the boy who tricked them all day. The chapter closes with Pony's parents arguing about whether the mysterious boy ever existed.

=== How Pony Baker Came Pretty Near Running Off With the Circus ===
Right before the circus comes to town, Pony throws a snowball at his mother's head as a joke. His mother is upset and boxes his ears. This leads to another round of wanting to run away. When the circus comes by, the boys watch the circus procession. Later that day, Pony helps carry water to the circus horses and is approached by a circus man. Jim Leonard tells him that Pony wants to join the circus. The man tells Pony to wait on his doorstep at one o'clock in the morning and the circus procession will pick him up.

=== How Pony Did Not Quite Get Off With the Circus ===
That night, Pony's father takes him and his sisters to the circus. His parents are very nice to him and Pony begins to have doubts. Later, Jim Leonard comes over and helps Pony pack. Pony gets into bed early and his mother comes to see him and apologizes for boxing his ears. Pony begins to cry. Pony eventually falls asleep and wakes up to circus music. He gets dressed and rushes to his front steps where he sees the circus magician. As he tries to escape the magician, his door disappears and Pony tries to hide by curling into a ball. Suddenly, his father and the doctor are standing by him looking down at him. The doctor claims Pony has been walking in his sleep. The next morning, Pony is relieved that the circus is far away, but is sick for several days. Pony and Jim never find out the truth of the circus magician.

=== The Adventures that Pony's Cousin, Frank Baker, Had with A Pocketful of Money ===
Pony's mother often encouraged Pony to play with his cousin, the other Frank Baker. Frank was much more responsible than Jim, and didn't get into nearly as much trouble. Pony wanted Frank's advice on the running away, but was ashamed to ask Frank, especially after hearing the story of how Frank delivered $2,000 from the city to the Boy's Town. When Frank was eleven, he went into the city with his mother. While in the city, he came across a merchant who needed someone to bring back money to Boy's Town. When the merchant finds that Frank is going back, he stuffs the money into Frank's pocket for him to deliver. On the way home, Frank's carriage is damaged and he cannot make it home. A bad thunderstorm occurs that night and Frank tries to stay awake to protect the money and his brother. Frank eventually falls into a deep sleep and does not wake up till daytime the next day. The next day Frank leaves his house after supper to take the money to the merchant's partner in town. He safely delivers the money and returns home. His father tells Frank that people who have large amounts of money seem to care more for it than they do their own brothers, and they believe the things that money can buy are more precious than the things it cannot. His father then tells him to get some rest.

=== How Jim Leonard Planned For Pony Baker To Run Off On a Raft ===
It is September when Jim tells Pony that he should run off again, and that he would come with. Their plan is to build a raft out of an old shanty in the woods. When schools starts, Jim and Pony ask the teacher if they can sit next to each other at school. After school, the two hang out in the hay-loft of Pony's barn. Jim persuades Pony that they are going to need to hide provisions for when they sneak away. The first day, Jim eats the food that Pony brings and the next day, Pony's dog Trip eats the food that Jim brings. Jim tells Pony that he must train Trip not to follow him into the barn. Pony then spends time teaching Trip not to do so. Pony missies Trip, but does it anyway. They continue to eat the provisions that they had stored. Jim then tells Pony that he must leave first and that Jim will follow him as soon as the river rises. Pony does not like the idea because he thinks Jim is backing out. The plan is for Pony to sleep next Friday in the barn and to leave early the next morning. Everyone afternoon from then on Pony brings bread-and-butter with meat and hides it in the hay while Jim would bring eggs to store as well. Friday comes and Jim tells Pony that he will sleep in the barn with Pony that night and help send him off the morning. The two dig out the provisions and find there are chickens in the eggs and the meat has gone bad. Jim tells Pony that if he cannot stay with Pony that night that he will come at six the next morning to wake Pony and send him off.

=== How Jim Leonard Backed Out, and Pony Had to Give Up ===
Pony finds Jim's constant changing of the plans to run off very odd, but does not say anything in fear of being called a cowardly-calf. Pony does not want to run off but does not see how he can help it. On Friday, Pony looks at Trip while he is standing at the barn doors and rushes towards the house to catch Trip who runs and jumps into his arms. His mother calls him in and asks why Pony is acting so quiet. She then asks if it is because Pony had a falling out with Jim Leonard and comments that she does not care for the boy. At that moment, Pony realizes he does not like Jim very much himself. Pony sneaks out that night to the barn with the lantern in his hand. When Pony gets to the loft, rats seem to swarm around him, but do not bother him. Pony is not able to fall asleep and soon begins to cry. As Pony's mother gets ready for bed, she realizes that Pony is not in his bed and that the lantern is missing. Pony's father heads into town to search for Pony, but none of the older boys had seen him, but say that Jim Leonard may know where he is. Pony's father goes to Jim's house, but his mother explains that he has been asleep for hours. He returns home and searches the house with Pony's mother who expects that the worse has happened to Pony. Finally, Pony's father goes out to the barn and hears Pony sobbing. Pony's father brings Pony back to the house where his mother holds him and kisses him while she cries. Pony explains to his mother what Jim Leonard had put him up to. At daybreak Pony's father remembers that he left his candle out in the barn when he was searching for Pony and he rushes out to get it in hopes that the barn has not burned down. While at the barn, he sees Jim Leonard sneaking towards the barn door. Pony's father pounces on Jim, grabs him by the collar, and takes Jim home where he tells his mother how he put Pony up to sneaking away. Pony gets sick for a week and his father talks with him and asks why Pony would want to run away from his home where they all love him so much. Pony explains how miserable he would have been had he run away from home and hopes that it will serve as a lesson for him. It also serves as a lesson for Pony's parents, who let Pony do more things and his mother does not baby him so much. Pony thinks this is because she is trying to be a better mother to him and, possibly, she does not baby him so much because Pony has a newborn baby brother for his mother to worry about instead, a brother who was born a week after Pony tried to run off.

== Main characters ==
- Frank "Pony" Baker: the main character of the story. He is a young boy who is little, dark, and round, with a thick crop of black hair. Nicknamed "Pony," so he would not be confused with his cousin of the same name.
- Pony's mother: Pony's overprotective mother whose actions demonstrate that she thinks Pony is too little to take care of himself.
- Pony's father: Pony's father whose actions towards Pony often seem to be things that Pony's mother puts him up to.
- Jim Leonard: Pony's closest friend in the story who continually attempts to persuade Pony to run away from home.
- Frank Baker: Pony's cousin who is a responsible and kind young man. He often takes great care of his younger brothers and younger boys in the Boy's Town. Pony's mother tries to get Pony to spend time with Frank instead of with Jim Leonard.
- Jim Leonard's mother

== Themes ==
Throughout the book Pony considers running away from home. Each time Pony attempts to run away, he realizes how caring and loving his family is. By the end of the book, he realizes that the things that made him want to run away inconsequential. One of the book's main themes is the importance of family and sticking together. In addition, the book is of the opinion that parents who coddle their children have worse relationships with them. The book believes parents should allow their children to grow and become independent individuals.

The Flight of Pony Baker is autobiographical both in its use of incidents from Howells's own childhood and in its reflection of his mature understanding of how those incidents had formed a psychological pattern—one that Freud would certainly have called a 'nuclear complex.' Indeed, Howells shows an intuitive knowledge not only of 'Oedipal' fears and desires, but of the psychological process by which a boy moves beyond them into the 'latency period.' In a Freudian sense, the 'flight' of Pony Baker, who is nine years old, may be interpreted as an escape from the turmoil of early childhood psychosexuality. Literally, the 'flight'—which never actually happens—refers to Pony's recurrent urge to run away from home; and the novel opens with two chapters about 'why he had a right to run off' because of his parents', and especially his mother's, mistreatment of him. Pony's naïve complaints mask a deeper conflict between his 'savage' impulses and his mother's 'civilizing' rules, which she imposes upon him directly and also indirectly by prevailing upon Pony's lenient father to support her. The rewards for Pony's resolution at the conclusion of the story are the prerogatives of growing up. Pony finds, to his pleasure, that his parents 'let him do more things,' and that his mother does not 'baby him so much before the boys.' Having become 'civilized,' he can now be trusted. Having repressed his boyish self, as figured in the "low down" Jim Leonard, Pony is ready to model himself on his manly namesake, cousin Frank Baker, who is 'one of those fellows that every mother would feel her boy was safe with.' Like the other boy-book boys, Pony Baker moves from the 'savage' into the 'civilized' realm.

== The Boy Book ==
"Credit for recognizing the boy book as a type is usually given to W.D. Howells, who observed in his review of Aldrich that 'no one else seems to have thought of telling the story of a boy's life, with so great desire to show what a boy's life is, and so little purpose of teaching what it should be.' Five years later Howells steered Mark Twain toward the conception of The Adventures of Tom Sawyer (1876) as 'a book for boys, pure & simple.'" Howells later contributed to the subgenre of realism with A Boy's Town (1890) and The Flight of Pony Baker (1902).

== Relationship with Huck Finn and Tom Sawyer ==
"Jim Leonard, the mischievous friend of Howells' protagonist, has been correctly described as 'a cross between Tom Sawyer and Huck Finn'; and the book shows these similarities throughout the book. Jim is an anti-hero who often does not face responsibility for his actions. The 'strange thing,' comments the narrator, '…was that he could have such a boy as Pony Baker under him so' (77). Jim's foil, the good Frank Baker, is presented as a role model (166), not as a figure of fun like Tom's brother Sid."
