= Stops of Various Quills =

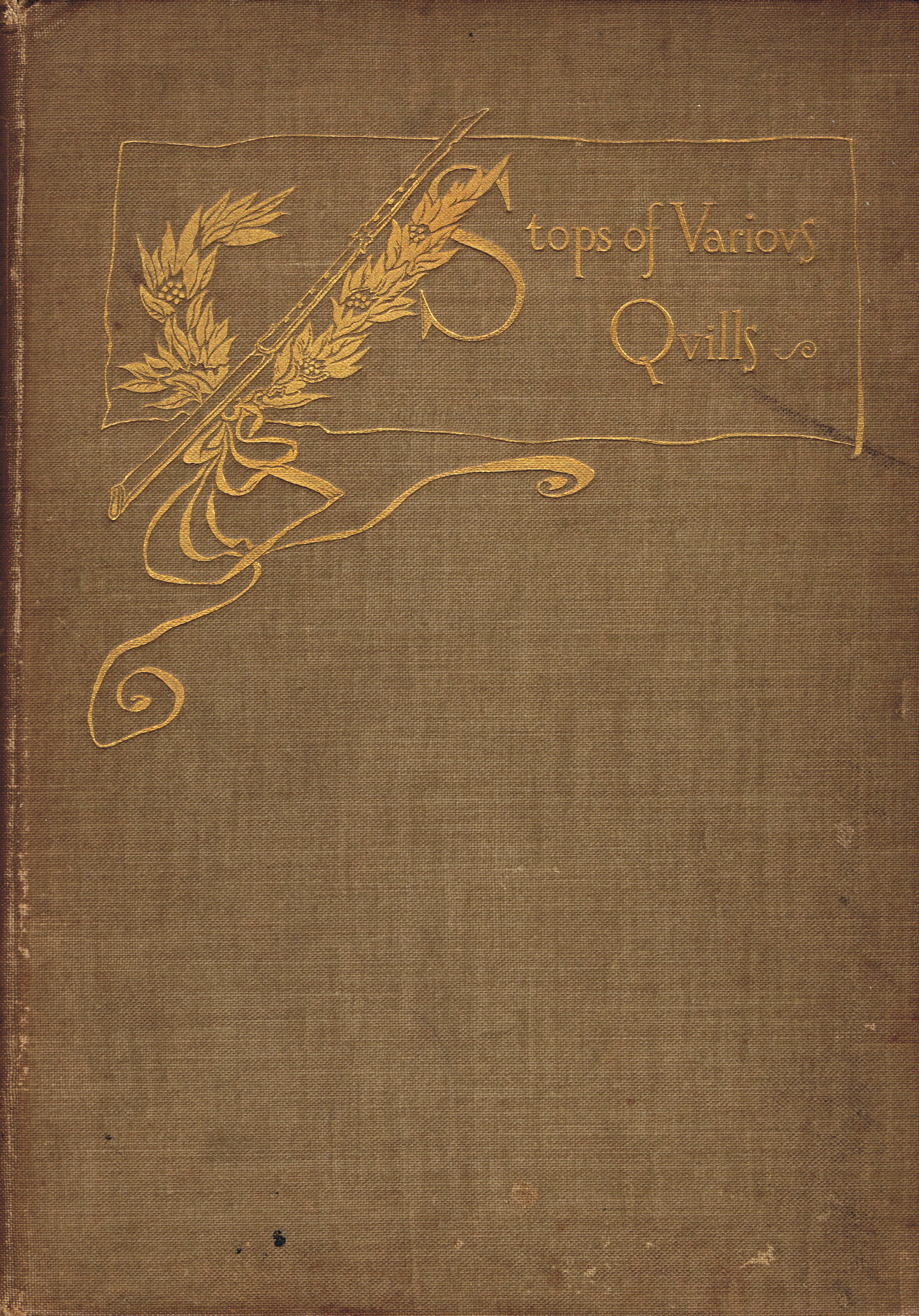
- Author: William Dean Howells
- Illustrator: Howard Pyle
- Language: English
- Publisher: Harper & Brothers
- Publication date: 1895
- Publication place: United States
- Media type: Print (Hardcover)
- Pages: 55
- OCLC: 670195864
- Text: Stops of Various Quills at Wikisource

Stops of Various Quills is an 1895 book written by William Dean Howells. 55 pages in length, it features 43 poems and illustrations by Howard Pyle.

== Overview ==
Howells had bonded with Pyle over similar ideas about literary realism and romance in literature and Pyle suggested a professional collaboration in 1891. Several poems by Howells with Pyle's illustration were published in Harper's Weekly before being collected as part of Stops of Various Quills. Henry Clarence Pitz, illustrator and Howard Pyle biographer, describes this collaborative work as "a labor of love"—where the "great kinship" that existed between author and illustrator is evident in "both text and picture." Howells and Pyle both lost children early in the year 1889; Howells, a daughter named Winifred and Pyle, a son named Sellers. Pitz relates how they "both suffered from interludes of melancholia" as a result—a term found etched in illustrations on the pages of "November" and "Question".

Drawing comparison to work of the Boecklin school, Pyle's illustrations have been described as lavish, and adorn each page. An "édition de luxe" was published (with a publication date of 1896), "limited to fifty copies, each signed by Mr. Howells and Mr. Pyle, with illustrations printed in sepia, and the full-page illustrations on Japan proofs in black." This edition sold for $15.

== Responses and analysis ==
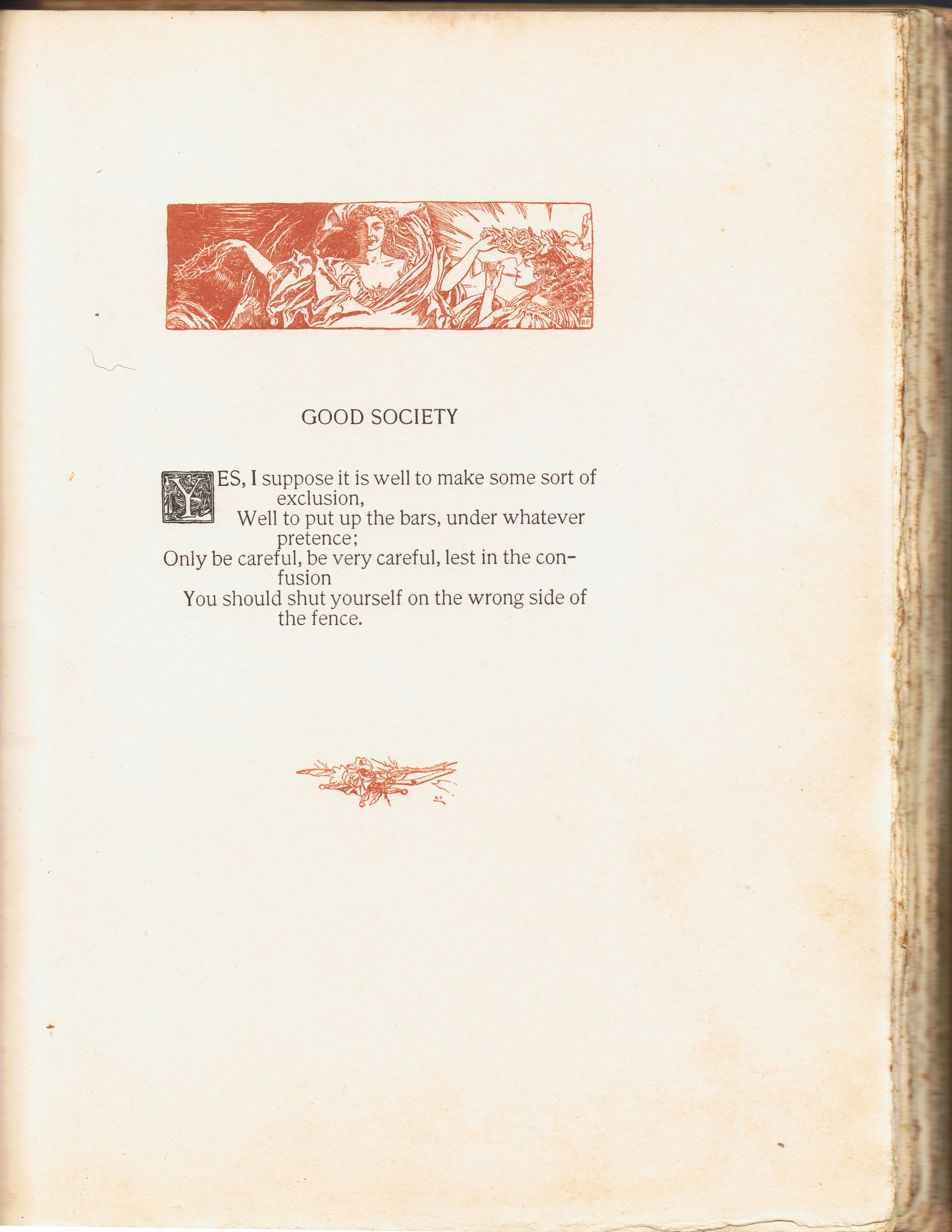
Limited edition printing with illustrations in sepia

The phrase "stops of various Quills" first appears in John Milton's poem "Lycidas", a well-known elegy which was written in 1637 about the drowning of Milton's friend Edward King. Howells's poems have been said to vary widely in craftsmanship, though Stops of Various Quills has been said to be of high quality and merit. One of the sonnets in the collection, "The Bewildered Guest", is considered to be one of his most quoted works. The book was also noted as dispelling the belief that Howells was a "fatheaded optimist". In conjunction with his collection Poems, Howells was said to be a "major force in the shaping of American literature".

Many of the poems in the collection explore themes of death and mourning. His daughter Winifred had died on March 3, 1889, of a mysterious illness after undergoing the rest cure under Silas Weir Mitchell. Henry K. Bush writes that Stops of Various Quills is "a haunting, well-wrought minor masterpiece that speaks powerfully to Howells's continuing bonds with his dead daughter — or at least, his urgent longing to believe in those bonds, and to maintain them".

== Sources ==
- Pitz, Henry C. (1975). Howard Pyle:Writer, illustrator, founder of the Brandywine School.
- Haralson, Eric (1998). Encyclopedia of American poetry: The nineteenth century. Taylor & Francis. ISBN 978-1-57958-008-7.
- Munsey's magazine. Vol. 15. The Frank A. Munsey Company. 1896. OCLC 39944154.
- William Dean Howells: a critical study. E.P. Dutton & Company. 1922. OCLC 274463.
- The Literary News. December 1895. OCLC 39944102.
