= A Counterfeit Presentment =

1877 play by William Dean Howells

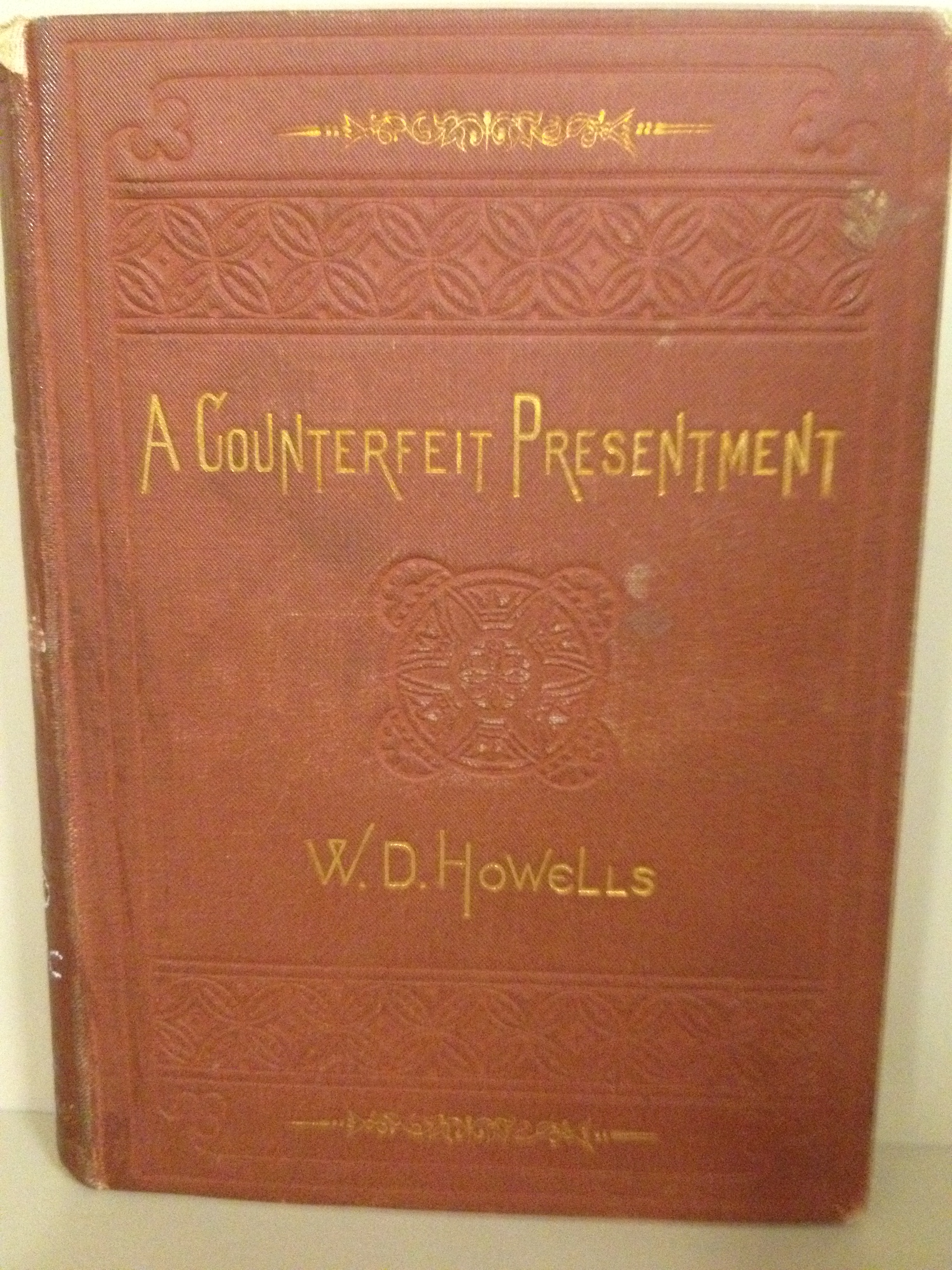
- A Counterfeit Presentment (first edition)
- Author: William Dean Howells
- Language: English
- Genre: Realism
- Publisher: James R. Osgood and Company
- Publication date: 1877
- Publication place: United States
- Media type: Print
- Pages: 155
- ISBN: 9781110654727

A Counterfeit Presentment is a play written by American author and playwright William Dean Howells in 1877. The play is a comedy in the genre of literary realism and tells the story of a chance encounter between a young woman, Constance, and a man whom she mistakes for her ex lover, Bartlett. However, Bartlett is not completely aware of Constance's neurotic behavior until he gets to know her a bit more. Her true personality is only truly expressed after she forces Bartlett to stay with her in the hotel so she can pretend he is her former beau. Howells uses comedy to reveal the deeper issue of the plight of unmarried middle and upper-class women in the 19th century.

== Synopsis ==
=== Act One: An Extraordinary Resemblance ===
Set at the Ponkwasset Hotel in Boston, the first act begins with Bartlett and his friend Cummings having a conversation about Bartlett's love life. Bartlett is depressed and has turned into a misanthrope because a girl he went on a date with was not interested in him anymore. As Bartlett is cursing all women and voicing his anger toward the entire female race, Cummings tries to cheer his friend up. He tells him the story of a girl who is still miserable about a break up that happened two years ago in hopes to prove to Bartlett that women do, indeed, have hearts. While they are speaking, General Wyatt, barges in yelling and cursing at Bartlett, ordering him to leave the hotel immediately. Then, when Constance and her mother enter the room, Constance faints at first sight of Bartlett. However, as General Wyatt approaches Bartlett he realizes that he has made the terrible mistake of yelling at a man he has never met before. Nevertheless, Bartlett is very upset and disturbed at the entire situation and storms out of the hotel. Cummings stays to speak with General Wyatt and realizes the general is terribly sorry for his earlier behavior. Once they are alone, General Wyatt tells Cummings the reason why he acted the way he did. Two years ago, Mrs. Wyatt brought Constance to Paris and Constance fell in love with an American man. However, when General Wyatt met the man he was very skeptical about him and soon found out that he was actually married. As a result of this unfortunate discovery, General Wyatt forced this man to end all relations with Constance, leaving her absolutely miserable and harboring a great deal of resentment towards her father, which has lasted for the past two years. Ironically, this was the same exact story that Cummings was telling Bartlett about just a few minutes ago. Although General Wyatt initially insisted that Bartlett leave the hotel premises to protect Constance, when Bartlett returns the general begs him to stay at Constance's request. Despite some initial skepticism, Bartlett agrees to stay.

=== Act Two: Distinctions and Differences ===
The second act of the play opens with Constance and Mrs. Wyatt having a private conversation in their room. Constance is an extremely dramatic young woman—she loves to cause a scene and is constantly seeking the undivided attention of all those around her. Like many other women in the late 19th century, she is primarily focused on getting married and starting a family. Before her relationship fell apart, Constance believed that the man she met in Paris was to be her husband and she had finished the race to matrimony. However, Constance still has not come to terms with the fact that her relationship with that man is over forever. She enjoys to pity herself in front of others and frequently tells her mother that she feels as though she is an evil vampire that repulses all men. Not being able to fathom listening to Constance's trivial problems anymore, Mrs. Wyatt shifts the conversation to the rift in Constance's relationship with her father. Ever since her father compelled her lover to end their relationship, Constance has blamed him for her misery and solitude. General Wyatt and Constance used to have a good relationship but now they are very distant to each other and Constance is extremely vocal about the resentment she feels towards her father. Mrs. Wyatt chastises Constance for her poor attitude towards the general, "How can you treat your father so coldly? Give me the pain if you must torment somebody. But spare your father, -- spare the heart that loves you so tenderly, you unhappy girl". She explains to her that General Wyatt did what was necessary to protect Constance and she should have a little more self-respect to not be so miserable, as well as more respect for her father, her ultimate protector. When Constance is finally alone, she invites Bartlett into her room to observe and question him in an attempt to find any similarities, besides looks, between Bartlett and her former lover. At first Bartlett does not realize Constance's intentions but once he does, he angrily storms out of the room. Bartlett and General Wyatt decide to go on a walk to the docks and Mrs. Wyatt comes back into Constance's room. Almost immediately after Mrs. Wyatt is with Constance, they see four men carrying someone up the hill through the window. True to form, Constance causes a huge, emotional scene. She springs up, exclaiming that her father is dead: “Oh, yes, yes! It’s papa! It’s my dear, good, kind papa! He’s dead; he’s drowned; I drove him away; I murdered him!” It's almost uncertain whether she was happy or sad at the possibility of her father being dead. Bartlett, witnessing this absolute hysteria, is very puzzled by such dramatic and preposterous actions by a seemingly proper young woman and questions his decision to stay at the hotel.

=== Act Three: Not at All Alike ===
The third and shortest act in the play is set six weeks later. Cummings returns to the hotel and to his surprise Bartlett has been staying with the Wyatts for the past six weeks. Bartlett, as usual, begins talking about his emotions with Cummings and admits to falling in love with Constance. However, aside from his love for Constance, Bartlett is secretly very offended by Constance's actions towards him—he has slowly become aware of the fact that the only reason she enjoys his company is because his features remind her of her former lover. Seeing that Bartlett is truly at a loss, Cummings advises his emotional friend to speak to Constance and profess his true feelings to her. When Bartlett sits down to speak to Constance and finally tells her that he has deep feelings for her, Constance immediately rejects him, putting on her usual melodramatic, self-pitying performance: “When he left me I seemed to die. Now I am some wretched ghost clinging for all existence to the thought of my lost unhappiness...I might have loved you – if I had – lived”. Annoyed with Constance's obsessive behavior, Bartlett confronts her of only befriending him as a way to pretend she was still with her former lover, which immediately sent Constance in a bitter, tearful rage. General and Mrs. Wyatt run into the parlor room as soon as they hear Constance's cries. At the sight of his distressed daughter, General Wyatt realizes that he must disclose a secret he has kept from her for the past two years. He shows Constance a note that her former beau wrote to General Wyatt, stating that he had no problem with promptly ending all relations with Constance. Reading this note and realizing that her former lover never truly loved her somehow immediately relieves Constance of all the woes that have been plaguing her for the past two years. Immediately all of her issues with her self-image, her father and her mother disappear. She turns to Bartlett and happily agrees to go on a date with him.

== Characters ==
- Bartlett: Bartlett is the young artist who the Wyatt's mistake for the man Constance had an affair with in Paris two years prior. Generally, he is a very emotional man and has only ever been hurt by women, which has led him to hold a grudge against the entire female race. For a moment we see a shift in Bartlett's character as initially is not as attached to Constance as he is to most women—he is often very annoyed with her and does not take to her very kindly. However, this developing strength of character is negated when he stays with the Wyatt's for the next six weeks and falls head over heels for Constance, despite her obviously using him to remind her of her former lover.
- Cummings: Cummings is a minister in Boston and Bartlett's closest friend. He has heard of the Wyatt's tribulations with Constance because his cousin is in contact with General Wyatt as they served in the same artillery during the Civil War. Cummings is Bartlett's conscience and often acts as a therapist to his sensitive friend.
- General Wyatt: General James Wyatt is married to Mrs. Wyatt and is father to Constance. He was a Civil War General in the 34th Artillery. General Wyatt did not approve of Constance's relationship with the American man in Paris and after he found out that he was actually married, he forced the man to end their relationship. This action caused a large rift in the relationship between father and daughter, and it is very apparent that General Wyatt is extremely sensitive about it. General Wyatt is a very passive man, but at times can seem overbearing. However, he does everything he can to make sure his wife and daughter happy and out of danger.
- Mrs. Wyatt: Margaret Wyatt is Constance's mother and General Wyatt's wife. All of the Wyatt's children died during the Civil War so she, like General Wyatt, is very over protective over Constance. However, Mrs. Wyatt is very honest with Constance and is not afraid to hurt her feelings in order to make Constance realize how pathetic she has become.
- Constance: Constance is the Wyatt's melodramatic and neurotic daughter. Two years ago she had a short affair with an American man in Paris and although the relationship ended as a result of his unfaithfulness, she is still very much obsessed with him. Constance has fixated herself on Bartlett because he looks almost identical to her former beau but besides looks the two have nothing in common, which proves very distressing to Constance. Due to the fact that General Wyatt brought on the break up, Constance begins to hate him and frequently voices these emotions to her mother. Mrs. Wyatt and Constance have a very good relationship, although at times Constance gets upset with her mother when she is being brutally honest. Constance is representative of the lonely woman who is fixated on marriage and motherhood because she believes that is her sole purpose in life. Her inability to fulfill these expectations is very stressful and has most likely caused her to become anorexic.

== Major themes ==
=== Anorexia ===
Constance is referred to as a “ghost” or an “apparition” multiple times throughout the course of the play. Howells has most likely employed this characterization to indicate that Constance is anorexic. Anorexia is a disease that Howells held very dear to his heart. In 1889, his beloved daughter, Winifred, succumbed to the disease when she was only 26 years old and weighed a mere 79 pounds. Although this unfortunate event happened over a decade after the publication of this play, it could be speculated that Winnie was already showing symptoms, since anorexia was becoming increasingly prevalent amongst young women her age.

Although some consider anorexia a "20th century disease", voluntary starvation by women has been traced back to as far as the 12th century. Therefore, an anorexic woman in the 19th century was not as rare of an encounter as most people believe it to be. Before being diagnosed as an actual disorder, doctors simply assumed that a lack of appetite in a female patient was a symptom of a different ailment. Research suggests that anorexia “was not recognized as a disorder until it was seen in wealthier families that had access to healthcare”. The first diagnosis of anorexia came from Sir William Gull, Queen Victoria's physician, in 1865, which labeled the disease as an actual disorder that most often targeted females between the ages of 16 and 23.
Girls like Constance, who were of the middle and upper class, often lived with their parents until they were married. Until these girls became the responsibility of their husbands, they were the light of their parents lives – especially Constance, who is left an only child after all of her siblings died during the Civil War. Parents treated their daughters as delicate and fragile beings that needed constant protection and guidance. Nevertheless, they still imposed a considerable amount of pressure for their daughters to marry and start families from an early age. This pressure often gave rise to anger and resentment in these women towards the stringency of their parents. Moreover, this necessity to fulfill their ultimate destiny of marriage and motherhood created a considerable amount of stress in the lives of these young women. All these emotions combined often resulted in anorexia or the development of other eating disorders. Constance, for example, feels a lot of resentment towards her father and a considerable amount of pressure to marry. Coming out of an extremely passionate relationship, she becomes a very unhappy person and feels as though she has lost control of her destiny. It is this loss of control that has most likely leads Constance to become anorexic.

=== Marriage ===
Constance is a young woman who is obsessed with getting married so that she can finally find meaning within her lonesome life. This type of obsessive behavior towards marriage was not uncommon in young women in the 19th century. The idea of separate spheres for women and men became very popular in the 19th century. This caused many middle and upper-class women to find themselves stuck in an intellectual predicament since they expressed so much potential, but were perceived to be too delicate and fragile to take any part in the outside world. They spent many years achieving a high level of education, a privilege that prior generations did not have, but their social status often did not approve them getting employment like men of a similar status. Consequently, after these women completed their education, they had no choice but to wait for a possible suitor to come to them and propose marriage.

Furthermore, as a result of the Civil War, there was a large shortage of young men of a military age, which was around the same age as marriage age. Some researchers argue that the loss of such a large proportion of the male population undermined the country's “established pattern of family formation and threatened the identity of white women as wives and mothers”. With the likelihood of marriage for women diminishing, more and more women became fixated on the institution itself. This fixation was expressed in actions like Constance's, where she has completely enveloped herself in the idea that she must find a husband immediately. Most women feared that if they remained unmarried past the average marriage age at the time, not only would they severely embarrass their families and themselves, but they also feared that they would never marry and thus never fulfill their ultimate destinies.

=== Father-daughter relationships ===
Through Constance and General Wyatt we see the evolution of a weak father-daughter relationship. Literature in the 19th century was frequently concerned with middle and upper-class family relations. Fathers and daughters often appeared in these writings and focused on the daughter learning to inhabit the role of a model daughter and wife. In one of Constance's therapeutic and emotional chats with her mother, we get a glimpse of what Constance's relationship was like with her father when she was a young girl. Like most young girls at the time, especially those with war heroes for fathers, she fulfilled the role of “daddy’s little girl” and truly idolized her father. The same could be said with the way General Wyatt regarded young Constance: he spoiled her, “took her everywhere with him, and wanted to give her everything”. In the Antebellum Era, daughters aimed to serve their fathers and practiced self-abnegation. Up until the incident in Paris, Constance followed this familial model, which is only conveyed at the end of the play when Constance instantly rekindles her love and respect for her father after he shows her the note. However, being the emotional, neurotic, attention craving young woman she is, Constance refused to listen to her father for the past two years, believing that he has severely wronged her. The tension between Constance and her father is expressed on many occasions. General Wyatt was truly trying to protect his beloved little girl when he forced her beau to end the relationship and on more than one occasion it is expressed that he misses having a good relationship with his daughter. However, Constance is incapable of understanding the situation in that context and openly admits that she no longer loves her father as she used to. Although Constance knows that her former lover was unfaithful towards her, she still blames General Wyatt for ruining her life because she feels as though he has destroyed all possibility for her to fulfill her destiny of marriage and motherhood.

== Production and critical reception ==
=== Adapted to stage ===
A Counterfeit Presentment is regarded the Howells' plays to truly have a successful stage life. It was performed by one of America's most illustrious actors at the time, Lawrence Barrett. While financially successful for Howells, the play was not very well received by most audiences. Although most considered it a very likeable story, A Counterfeit Presentment was also found to be a bit boring, as it is lacking in much action. Audiences were also very surprised at the fact that the play belittles the theater at times. Critics point out that "when Bartlett is told the “tragic” story of a young lady who has come infelicitously to the hotel, a lady whom he is destined to wed, he exclaims, tellingly: “Oh, come now! You don’t expect me to believe that! It isn’t a stage-play."”

== About the author ==
William Dean Howells was a very prominent and successful realist author in the second half of the 19th and early 20th centuries. In addition to writing for the Atlantic Monthly and Harper's Magazine, Howells was the author of a significant number of realist plays and novels. In 1871, he was named editor of the Atlantic Monthly, a position that he maintained for the next ten years. The objective of most of his plays was to acknowledge and promote the importance of “little morsels of drama”. The communication between his characters is depicted in simple conversations, but with a hidden knowledge of each other. Howells became a prominent writer of dramatic realism in the United States between 1856 and 1916 because he created an intimate drama that was relatable and easy for the general public to understand.

== Sources ==
- Goodman, Susan; Carl Dawson (2005). William Dean Howells: A Writer's Life. Berkeley: University of California. pp. 545. ISBN 978-0520238961.
- Sonenklar, Carol (2011). Anorexia and Bulimia. Minneapolis: Twenty-First Century Books. ISBN 9780761363736.
- "A Fear of Food: A History of Eating Disorders".
- Hacker, J.D.; Libra Hilde; James H. Jones (2010). "The Effect of the Civil War on Marriage Patterns" (PDF). Journal of Southern History. LXXVI (1). Archived from the original (PDF) on 5 September 2012.
- Ackerman, Alan L. (1999). The Portable Theater: American Literature and the Nineteenth-century Stage. Baltimore, MD: Johns Hopkins University Press. p. 296. ISBN 978-0801869112.
- Howells, William Dean (1877). A Counterfeit Presentment. Boston: James R. Osgood and Company. pp. 155. ISBN 978-1110654673.
- Ackerman, Alan (1997). "The Right to Reserve Privacy: William Dean Howells and the Rise of Dramatic Realism". American Literary Realism, 1870-1910. 30 (1): 1–19. JSTOR 27746711.
- Giffen, Allison (2003). "Dutiful Daughters and Needy Fathers: Lydia Sigourney and Nineteenth-Century Popular Literature". Women's Studies. 32 (3): 255–280. doi:10.1080/00497870310069.
