= The Lady of The Aroostook =

1879 novel by William Dean Howells

- First edition
- Author: William Dean Howells
- Language: English
- Genre: Literary Realism
- Publisher: H.O. Houghton and Company
- Publication date: 1879
- Publication place: United States

The Lady of The Aroostook is a novel written by William Dean Howells in 1879. It was published in Cambridge, Massachusetts by H. O. Houghton and Company.

== Plot summary ==
Lydia Blood, a young woman from South Bradfield, Massachusetts, lives with her Aunt Maria and her grandfather, Deacon Latham. Lydia possesses beauty, intelligence, and a beautiful singing voice that she hopes to pursue as a career. Her Aunt Josephine, from her father's side of the family in Venice, Italy, invites her to live with her and pursue her singing career. Lydia and her grandfather travel to Boston to board the ship Aroostook, captained by Captain Jenness, who assures Lydia that she will be comfortable on the ship. Lydia is the only woman on board, which worries her aunt Maria, but Minister Goodlow and Deacon Latham assure her that Lydia will be fine.

On the ship, Lydia meets two men, Mr. James Staniford and Mr. Charles Dunham, who had previously encountered her in Boston. They are curious about Lydia's reason for traveling to Europe at such a young age and view her with a mix of interest and condescension. Staniford is intrigued by Lydia and finds her fascinating, seeing her as book smart but lacking common sense due to her sheltered life. He starts flirting with her and feels the need to protect her from her "helpless loneliness."

During their voyage, Staniford and Lydia spend time together, but Lydia also develops a friendship with another passenger, Mr. Hicks. Staniford becomes jealous and confronts Lydia about her relationship with Hicks. However, as the weather worsens, Staniford falls ill and becomes distant towards Lydia. When a storm hits, Hicks gets drunk and starts causing trouble. Staniford threatens him, but Hicks challenges him to a fight. In the scuffle, Hicks accidentally falls overboard, and Staniford jumps in to save him. They both survive, but Lydia locks herself in her room and keeps her distance from Staniford and Hicks.

When the ship reaches Messina, Staniford offers Hicks money to leave the ship and go back to Boston. Lydia sees this as an act of kindness, but Staniford believes it is worth more than what he lent Hicks. Staniford and Dunham decide to stay in Messina while the ship undergoes repairs. Staniford is confused by Lydia's anger towards him and wonders why she isn't congratulating him. He realizes that Lydia is growing and changing, and he doesn't fully understand her.

== Character list ==
- Lydia Blood: Lydia begins the story as a young nineteen-year-old, innocent girl from the small town of South Bradfield. She is gifted with beauty and an astonishing singing voice. She is traveling to Venice aboard the Aroostook in order to live with her Aunt and Uncle and to cultivate her voice. Both of her parents died when she was very young and she moved to live with her Aunt Maria and her grandfather Deacon Latham on their farm in South Bradfield, Massachusetts. Throughout her journey on the Aroostook, Lydia falls in love with her shipmate, James Staniford, and she encounters the passage of innocence to experience.
- James Staniford: James Staniford is a wealthy man in his late twenties from Boston who is traveling on the Aroostook with his friend Charles Dunham. Staniford lost a great deal of his money through a bad business venture and he is traveling to Europe in order to relieve his woes. Staniford is determined to live the life of a bachelor but during his journey on the Aroostook he falls in love with Lydia Blood. Staniford becomes the type of man that he had once made fun of, but it is for the better.
- Charles Dunham: Charles Dunham is traveling to Europe to reunite with his lost love, Miss. Hibbard. He had proposed to Miss. Hibbard but she had denied his request and left for Europe. While in Europe she wrote for him to come find her and to marry her. Dunham is a kind man who is very generous to Lydia and he makes her feel at home on the Aroostook.
- Captain Jenness: Captain Jenness is the Captain of the Aroostook. He is gentle but confident man and he makes sure that Lydia is comfortable during her trip on the Aroostook. Jenness has a wife and two daughters who are close to Lydia's age.
- Mr. Hicks: Hicks is a drunk who is traveling on the Aroostook in order to cure himself. He had once been studying to become a doctor but his alcoholism prevented him from doing so. During the trip Hicks falters and becomes drunk one night, Captain Jenness is forced to kick him off of the Aroostook.
- Aunt Maria: Lydia's mother's sister who cares for her after Lydia's parents die. She has a great talent for dress making and she prepares all of Lydia's outfits.
- Deacon Latham: Deacon Latham is Lydia's grandfather. He lives with Maria on their farm in South Bradfield. He is a spritely man for his age and he is the one who found Captain Jenness and the Aroostook. He accompanies Lydia during her journey to Boston.
- Aunt Josephine: Josephine is Lydia's father's sister. She moved to Venice because it was the only climate that suited her health needs. She appears to be completely transformed by her years of living and Europe, but at heart she is truly an American.
- Uncle Henshaw: Henshaw is married to Josephine and he is an Englishman. He is fascinated by Americans and the certain idioms and phrases that they use

== Themes ==
The Lady of the Aroostook is a novel about the passage of innocence to experience for a young girl and also about the breaking of old customs and traditions. At the beginning of the novel Lydia is a young innocent girl who has had little to no interactions with men. Throughout her journey on the Aroostook and her interactions with Staniford in particular, she begins to fall in love and pass from an innocent young girl to an experience mature woman. The love between Lydia and Staniford is considered to be very taboo at the time, not only because of how they came to be in love, during a journey in which Lydia was the only female on board the ship, but also because of the difference in their age and their status in society. The love and the bond between them breaks the previous barriers that had been set up by outdated customs and traditions.

== Critical reception ==
The Publishers' Weekly published on February 15, 1879, wrote about the upcoming book, The Lady of The Aroostook by William Dean Howells. They wrote that few readers think it will be his best work, but nevertheless Howells is a wonderful writer and "anyone who fails to read this, or any of Mr. Howells' stories, misses a great pleasure."

== Other ==
William Dean Howells was published by H.O. Houghton and Company. Houghton was the cofounder of Houghton Mifflin and was also mayor of Cambridge, Massachusetts; the city where he published Howells’ novel. Howells had a tenure as a writer for and an editor for the Atlantic Monthly. He published The Lady of the Aroostook over a period of twelve months in the Atlantic Monthly.
