= Dr. Breen's Practice =

Novel by William Dean Howells

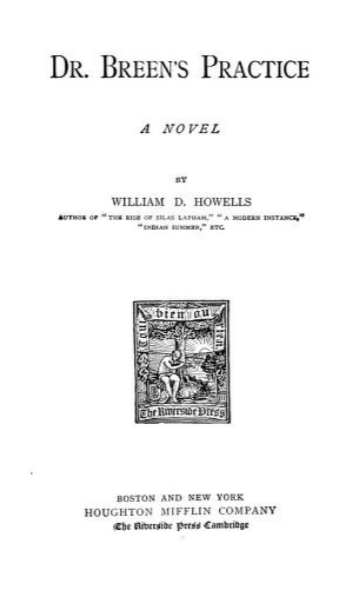
- Title page for Dr. Breen's Practice (1881)
- Author: William Dean Howells
- Language: English
- Published: 1881 Houghton Mifflin
- Publication place: United States
- Pages: 272

Dr. Breen's Practice is a novel, one of the earlier works by American author and literary critic William Dean Howells. Houghton Mifflin originally published the novel in 1881 in both Boston and New York. Howells wrote in the realist style, creating a faithful representation of the commonplace, and in this case describing everyday mannerisms that embody the daily lives of middle-class people.

== Plot summary ==
The story takes place in the late 19th century at Jocelyn's hotel on the beach outside of Newport, Rhode Island, and is told through the voice of a third person narrator. At the hotel croquet court we meet a sickly woman named Louise Maynard and her physician, Dr. Grace Breen. Breen is a graduate of the New York homeopathic school, who has become a doctor to make a difference and prove her worth as a woman. She is cool towards men because the love of her life ran off with her best friend.

When Mr. Libby, an old friend of Mrs. Maynard's, asks her to go sailing, Dr. Breen insists it will be bad for her health, but Mrs. Maynard goes anyways. The weather takes a turn for the worse and the boat capsizes in the bitter waters. Mrs. Maynard blames Dr. Breen for allowing her to go out into the storm.

After this incident, Mrs. Maynard's condition worsens and she trusts Dr. Breen even less than she did before. She requests a consultation from a male doctor, so Dr. Breen decides to contact Dr. Rufus Mulbridge, a local physician who practices mainstream, conventional medicine.

Miss Gleason, another woman staying at the hotel, insists that Dr. Breen is the best option for Mrs. Maynard, and that if she calls for a consultation from Dr. Mulbridge, she will be making it harder for female physicians to act without a man's assistance. When Dr. Breen arrives at Dr. Mulbridge's office, the reader sees that while he has an established place of business, she works and lives at a hotel, and while he has many patients, she only treats one woman.

After relinquishing Mrs. Maynard's case to Dr. Mulbridge, Dr. Breen assumes the role of nurse under his instruction. He diagnoses Mrs. Maynard with pneumonia, Dr. Breen telegraphs Mr. Maynard, who is out in Wyoming working on a ranch, telling him of his wife's condition.

Mr. Libby and Dr. Breen take a boat ride to New Leyden to receive a telegraph from Mr. Maynard. Mr. Libby professes his love for Dr. Breen.

In spite of his mother's disdain of the professional woman, Dr. Mulbridge also professes his love for Dr. Breen, and proposes to her. However, since he doesn't believe in women's rights or women being able to take men's positions in the world, and he is a mannerless oaf, Mrs. Mulbridge correctly predicts that she will reject him.

When Mr. Maynard arrives at Jocelyn's he suggests that Dr. Breen and Mrs. Maynard come out to Wyoming to live with him., where Dr. Breen could have her own practice. However, she decides that she wasted her time training to become a doctor, and that she would rather go to the opera, ballets, and eventually travel to Italy. She professes her love to Mr. Libby, and they walk down the beach in the moonlight together.

Dr. Mulbridge comes back to Jocelyn's to again ask Dr. Breen to marry him, but she is now an engaged woman. Grace goes on to marry Mr. Libby and they live in southern New Hampshire near his mills. While Mr. Libby works at the mills, Dr. Breen indulges herself by going to plays and shows in Boston, but she also decides to continue practicing medicine.

In the end she has what she originally wanted by practicing medicine, and what she came to love, through her marriage to Mr. Libby.

== Characters ==
- Grace Breen- The protagonist of the story, Dr. Breen is twenty-eight years old; she has brown hair, and is a very handsome young woman. As one of the very few women in the medical profession at the time, she graduated from the New York homeopathic school of medicine. Despite her intellect, she is very uncertain of her life decisions, her personal relationships, and her role within the world around her.
- Louise Maynard- Mrs. Maynard is Dr. Breen's one and only patient in the novel. She has a cold and lung problems that are treated over the course of the story.
- George Maynard- Mr. Maynard is absent for the majority of the novel, as he and Mrs. Maynard are separated. He works in Cheyenne, Wyoming on a cattle ranch. He has a sense of humor, despite his sad, dull, untrimmed appearance.
- Walter Libby- Mr. Libby is a constant presence in the story. He was abroad in Europe with Mr. and Mrs. Maynard, and comes to Jocelyn's, seemingly trying to woo Mrs. Maynard while she is separated from Mr. Maynard. This turns out not to be the case, as he professes his love to Grace. She refuses at first but eventually reciprocates his love.
- Rufus Mulbridge- Dr. Mulbridge is the doctor Grace decides to contact when she wants a second opinion on Mrs. Maynard's condition. He is thirty-five years old; he is an intelligent but unattractive, lazy man who dresses in plain clothing. He falls in love with Dr. Breen, but she rejects him.
- Mrs. Mulbridge- Mrs. Mulbridge is Dr. Mulbridge's mother and receptionist. An old fashioned woman, she brings a different point of view to the story, professing disdain of professional woman and does not see why a woman (Dr. Breen) should be able to hold the same title as her esteemed son.

== Themes ==
Dr. Breen's Practice is about the rise of women into the medical field in the 19th century and the subsequent decision they had to make between the pursuit of a medical career and the temptation of marriage. In the late 19th century many people doubted that a woman could balance the professional life of a doctor with the more typical path of marriage. Dr. Breen is a great representation of this ethical dilemma.

The author, William Dean Howells wrote the first American novel to have a female doctor as the protagonist, and one of the first to have a female doctor mentioned at all. At a time when female doctors were rare, Howells put them at the forefront of his work.

In this story, Grace Breen displays little confidence in herself as a physician, and at times regrets having become a doctor. In his essay on “Marriage and the American Medical Woman in Dr. Breen’s Practice”, Frederick Wegener quotes Jean Masteller's article, saying “Grace Breen should never have become a physician, since she lacked…the necessary… temperament to succeed in her rigorous career”. By late 19th century tenets, Dr. Breen marrying Mr. Libby meant she was neglecting her medical career and accepting her fate as just another married woman, but instead she embraces the challenge and does both. William Dean Howells's depiction of the modern female physician challenged the social and gender roles of the time period.

== Critical reception ==
A review in the Atlantic Monthly, “Portrait of a Lady and Dr. Breen’s Practice”, stated that William Dean Howells was able to do something not many authors had done, and that was showing people of New England the humor within their uptight lifestyles. This review is glowing with praise; the reviewer describes Howells's writing as delightful and proclaims that not many writers have the ability to create such a strong bond with their readers. The novel was also discussed in Contemporary Review and the Westminster Review. In more recent times, it has been studied as an example of the portrayal of doctors in nineteenth century literature.
