= A Modern Instance =

1882 novel by William Dean Howells

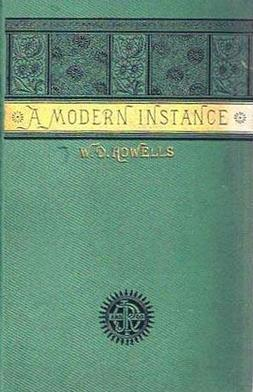
- First edition
- Author: William Dean Howells
- Language: English
- Genre: Literary realism
- Publisher: J. R. Osgood & Co.
- Publication date: 1882
- Publication place: United States
- Media type: Print (Hardcover)
- Pages: 514

A Modern Instance is a realistic novel written by William Dean Howells, and published in 1882 by J. R. Osgood & Co. The novel is about the deterioration of a once loving marriage under the influence of capitalistic greed. It is the first American novel by a canonical author to seriously consider divorce as a realistic outcome of marriage.

== Summary ==
The novel explores the deterioration of a marriage doomed from the outset by the imbalance between the emotional involvements of the two partners. The story chronicles the rise and fall of the romance between Bartley Hubbard and Marcia Gaylord, who migrate from Equity, Maine, to Boston, Massachusetts, following their marriage.

At the beginning of the story, the almost deranged depth of the wife's devotion to her husband makes it clear that troubles will arise, and so they do, although they do so after some tried and true opportunities for alienation are skirted: the husband is actually moderately fond of the wife, avoids drink, and endeavors a career in journalism to support her and, eventually, their daughter. However, his moral weakness and eye for the ladies involve the couple in a deepening cycle of accusation and subsequent remorse (on the part of Marcia) and resentment and escapism (on the part of Bartley), culminating in the seemingly permanent disappearance of Bartley after one of the pair's quarrels. Marcia Hubbard, lost and desolate in the gloom of her husband's abandonment, is a figure of fascination to Bartley's one-time friend Ben Halleck, who secretly is attracted to her. He is torn apart by the situation of being attracted to a married woman, and bends over backwards to try and effectuate a reunion between Marcia and his former friend Bartley for whom he no longer has any feeling but contempt. The story concludes in a meaningless vortex of isolation representing modern society. Marcia Hubbard confines herself to her father's home in Equity, Maine. Even after the eventual death out West of Bartley, Ben Halleck continues to torment himself over what had been his transgressive love, unable to determine whether or not he should seize the chance and propose to her.

== Significance ==
A Modern Instance is regarded as one of the most pivotal works in the career of William Dean Howells; it solidified his reputation as a champion of realism in the United States. Part of that realism is the groundbreaking unapologetic portrait of Bartley Hubbard as an agnostic and which could be modeled on Howells' friend Mark Twain. A version of the Bartley Hubbard character reappears as a somewhat sleazy journalist interviewing the title character at the beginning of Howells's novel The Rise of Silas Lapham (1885).
