= The Rise of Silas Lapham =

1885 Novel by William Dean Howells

- First edition
- Author: William Dean Howells
- Language: English
- Genre: Literary realism
- Publication date: 1885
- Publication place: United States
- Pages: 341

The Rise of Silas Lapham is a realist novel by William Dean Howells published in 1885. The story follows the materialistic rise of Silas Lapham from rags to riches, and his ensuing moral susceptibility. Silas earns a fortune in the paint business, but he lacks social standards, which he tries to attain through his daughter's marriage into the aristocratic Corey family. Silas' morality does not fail him. He loses his money but makes the right moral decision when his partner proposes the unethical selling of the mills to English settlers.

Howells is known to be the father of American realism, and a denouncer of the sentimental novel. The resolution of the love triangle of Irene Lapham, Tom Corey, and Penelope Lapham highlights Howells' rejection of the conventions of sentimental romantic novels as unrealistic and deceitful.

== List of characters ==
- Silas Lapham
- Penelope Lapham
- Persis Lapham
- Irene Lapham
- Tom Corey
- Bromfield Corey
- Anna Corey
- Milton K. Rogers

== Plot summary ==
The novel begins with Silas Lapham, a middle-aged native of rural New England, being interviewed for a newspaper story about his rise to wealth in the mineral paint business. Despite his limited education, Lapham is a shrewd and hardworking man, an American success story. But he, his wife, and two daughters feel socially awkward compared to other wealthy Bostonians. They decide to build a new home in the fashionable Back Bay neighborhood, and Lapham spares no expense in making it impressive.

Tom Corey, a young man from an "old money" Boston family, shows an interest in the Lapham girls, and Mr. and Mrs. Lapham assume he is attracted to Irene, their beautiful younger daughter. Tom joins the Lapham paint business in an attempt to find his place in the world, rather than rely on his wealthy father. Tom introduces Lapham to the cream of Boston society at a dinner party, and they remain on good terms even though the occasion turns out to be embarrassingly awkward.

As Tom continues calling on the Laphams regularly, it's assumed that he wants to marry Irene, and she hopes for just such a result. Tom, however, later shocks both families by revealing that he loves Penelope, the older, less glamorous but more intelligent and thoughtful sister. Though Penelope has feelings for Tom, she is held back by the romantic conventions of the era, not wanting to act on her love for fear of betraying her sister.

Meanwhile, Lapham and his wife Persis sometimes clash over his treatment of people from their less prosperous past. For instance, Lapham is generous to the widow and daughter of his fallen Civil War comrade Jim Millon, feeling that he owes the man his life. He quietly sends money to Millon's widow and gives the daughter a job. When Persis Lapham objects that she thinks the two women are taking advantage of her husband's generosity to the possible detriment of his reputation, Lapham insists he is paying a debt of honor. Persis also faults her husband for distancing himself from his former business partner Milton K. Rogers, who has come down in the world since their association ended, but Lapham insists he has treated Rogers fairly.

Amid the uproar over the Corey courtship, however, Rogers reappears, asking for money for a series of schemes. Persis convinces her husband to provide the help. Unfortunately, Rogers proves to be a very poor businessman, causing the Laphams' to lose considerable sums. On top of that, Lapham's major asset, his new home on Beacon Street, burns down before its completion due to his own carelessness. However, Lapham turns down the opportunity to salvage his fortunes by participating in a dishonest scheme contrived by Rogers and unscrupulous English investors. Likewise, when a purchaser offers to buy Lapham's paint business, Lapham discloses that the business will fail due to a new competitor, and the purchaser abandons the sale.

The Laphams are thus forced to move back to their modest former residence, where the mineral paint was first developed, and, ultimately, the competitor buys the business, with Lapham reduced to the status of employee. The Laphams, though not destitute, are now no longer wealthy. Tom and Penelope are finally able to marry after Irene accepts their romance. The elder Laphams, living in the countryside, are left to reflect on their extraordinary rise and decline.

== Composition and publication history ==
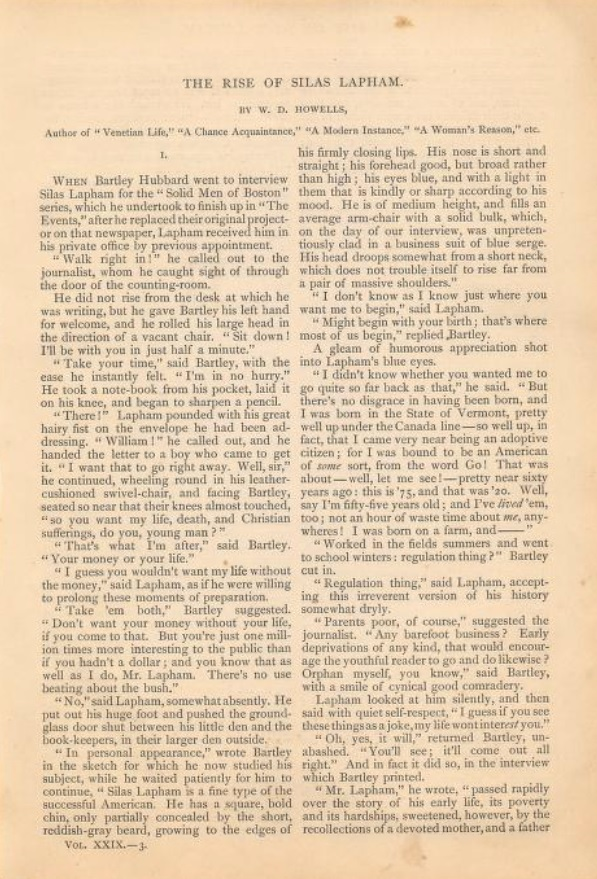
The Rise of Silas Lapham first appeared as a serialized novel in The Century Magazine beginning in its November 1884 issue.

Howells had moved to Massachusetts in the 1860s and became influential as the editor of the Atlantic Monthly, a role he held until 1881. The 1880s proved to be an extremely prolific period for him; in that decade, Howells published nine novels, a novella, several magazine articles, and a few plays. He completed The Rise of Silas Lapham while living at 302 Beacon Street in Boston.

The Rise of Silas Lapham was first serialized in The Century Magazine beginning in 1884, the same year that the magazine also serialized The Bostonians by Henry James and Adventures of Huckleberry Finn by Mark Twain, two other important examples of literary realism. The magazine's editor, Richard Watson Gilder, was concerned about any descriptions of violence, however, especially after recent anarchist activity, and asked Howells to edit a line that was originally as a character noting his desire of "applying dynamite to those rows of close-shuttered, handsome, brutally insensitive houses".

== Analysis ==
Historian Francis Parkman, a contemporary of Howells's, had difficulty understanding the realism of the book. He instead judged it by his more romantic standards and sought a didactic purpose for the story. As he wrote, "It is an admirable portraiture, realistic in the best sense of the word. It must touch the consciousness of a great many people; and as we descendants of the Puritans are said to be always on the lookout for a moral — it will teach the much needed lesson that money cannot do everything."

Historian Scott E. Casper suggested that The Rise of Silas Lapham was partly a satire on contemporary biography conventions. Howells, who had written a campaign biography of Abraham Lincoln, attacked the formulaic style of biographies of the day, including the "rise" from early adversity to later success. Howells emphasized this early in the book where Lapham is interviewed by Bartley Hubbard (a character revived from his 1882 novel A Modern Instance) who interjects while his subject tells his life story with assumptions of his romanticized life. Further, the title character is excessively class-conscious and worries about being humiliated for not fitting in with the culture of wealthy Boston, as exemplified in a scene where he struggles to determine if it is appropriate to wear gloves to a particular event, but refuses to ask for help.

== Adaptations ==
The Rise of Silas Lapham was adapted into a play of the same name by Lillian Keal Sabine in 1919. It opened to positive reviews.
