= An Imperative Duty =

1891 short realist novel by William Dean Howells

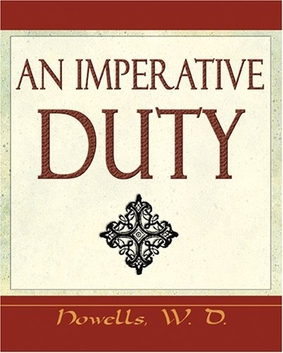
- Author: William Dean Howells
- Original title: An Imperative Duty: A Novel
- Language: English
- Genre: Literary realism
- Publisher: Harper & Brothers
- Publication date: 1891 (First Edition)
- Publication place: United States
- Pages: 150

An Imperative Duty is a short realist novel by William Dean Howells published in 1891. The novel explores the idea of "passing" through the racially mixed character of Rhoda Aldgate, a young woman whose aunt informs her that she is one-sixteenth African American. Rhoda lived her whole life "passing" as a white person.

== List of Characters ==
- Rhoda Aldgate, a woman of one-sixteenth black ancestry
- Rev. Mr. Bloomingdale, Rhoda's first suitor, a white man
- Dr. Olney, Mrs. Meredith's physician and Rhoda's eventual suitor, a white man
- Mrs. Meredith, Rhoda's aunt, a white woman

== Plot summary ==
The book is about Rhoda Aldgate, a young woman who discovers she is one-sixteenth African American, after living her whole life as a white person. Rhoda's father was Mrs. Meredith's brother, a white man, and Rhoda's mother was a southern woman of one-eighth black ancestry. In the nineteenth century, Rhoda's mother would have been referred to as an "octoroon."

== Themes ==
The book is about a "Tragic Mulatta" character, a stereotype used by 19th-century American authors to explore racial miscegenation.
