= William Dean Howells =

American author, critic, and playwright (1837–1920)

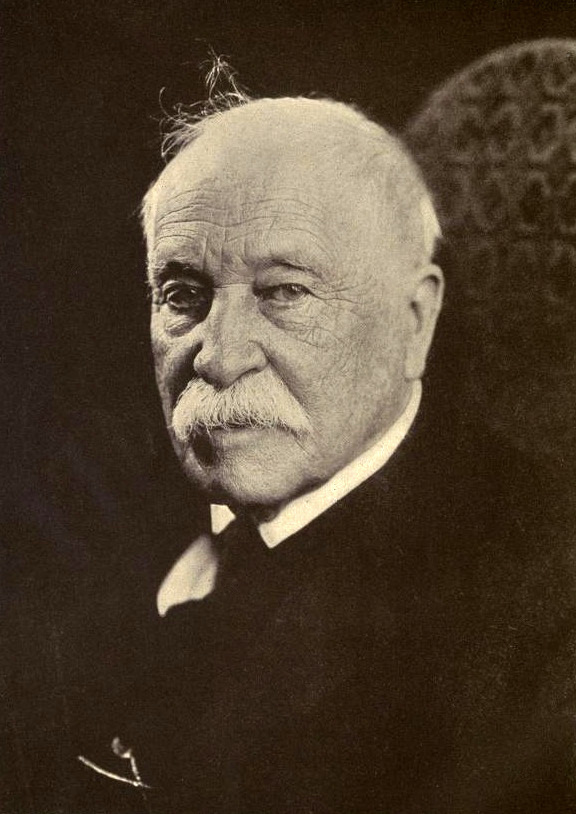
- Born: March 1, 1837; Martinsville, Ohio U.S.
- Died: May 11, 1920 (aged 83); Manhattan, New York U.S.
- Writing career
- Language: English
- Genres: novel; drama; literary criticism
- Movement: American Realism

United States Consul to Venice
- In office 1861–1865
- Appointed by: Abraham Lincoln
- Preceded by: J. J. Sprenger

William Dean Howells (/ˈhaʊəlz/ HOW-əlz; March 1, 1837 – May 11, 1920) was an American realist novelist, literary critic, playwright, and diplomat, nicknamed "The Dean of American Letters". He was particularly known for his tenure as editor of The Atlantic Monthly, as well as for the novels The Rise of Silas Lapham and A Traveler from Altruria, and the Christmas story "Christmas Every Day", which was adapted into a 1996 film of the same name.

== Biography ==
=== Early life and family ===
William Dean Howells was born on March 1, 1837, in Martinsville, Ohio (now known as Martins Ferry, Ohio), to William Cooper Howells and Mary Dean Howells, the second of eight children. He had Welsh, German, Irish, and English ancestry. His father was a newspaper editor and printer who moved frequently around Ohio. In 1840, the family settled in Hamilton, Ohio, where his father oversaw a Whig newspaper and followed Swedenborgianism. Their nine years there were the longest period that they stayed in one place. The family had to live frugally, although the young Howells was encouraged by his parents in his literary interests. He began at an early age to help his father with typesetting and printing work, a job known at the time as a printer's devil. In 1852, his father arranged to have one of his poems published in the Ohio State Journal without telling him.

=== Early career ===
In 1856, Howells was elected as a clerk in the State House of Representatives. In 1858, he began to work at the Ohio State Journal, where he wrote poetry and short stories, and also translated pieces from French, Spanish, and German. He avidly studied German and other languages and was greatly interested in Heinrich Heine. In 1860, he visited Boston, Massachusetts and met with writers James T. Fields, James Russell Lowell, Oliver Wendell Holmes Sr., Nathaniel Hawthorne, Henry David Thoreau, and Ralph Waldo Emerson. He became a personal friend to many of them, including Henry Adams, William James, Henry James, and Oliver Wendell Holmes Jr.

In 1860 Howells wrote Abraham Lincoln's campaign biography Life of Abraham Lincoln and subsequently gained a consulship in Venice. He married Elinor Mead on Christmas Eve 1862 at the American embassy in Paris. She was a sister of sculptor Larkin Goldsmith Mead and architect William Rutherford Mead of the firm McKim, Mead, and White. Among their children was architect John Mead Howells.

=== Editorship and other literary pursuits ===
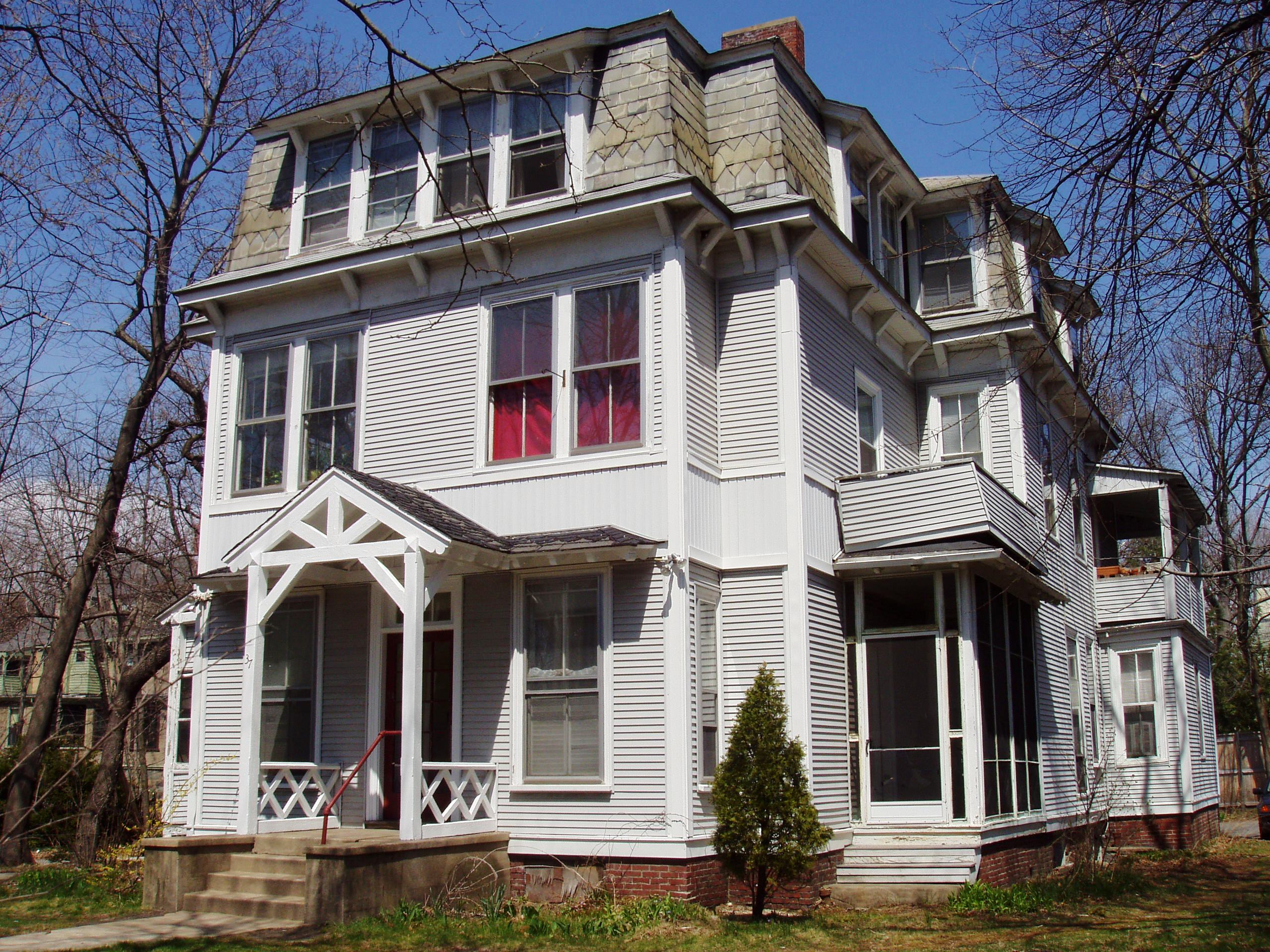
The William Dean Howells House in Cambridge, Massachusetts, was designed by his wife Elinor Mead, and it was occupied by Howells and his family from 1873 to 1878.

Howells and his family returned to the United States in 1865 and settled in Cambridge, Massachusetts. He wrote for various magazines, including The Atlantic Monthly and Harper's Magazine. In January 1866, James Fields offered him a position as assistant editor at The Atlantic Monthly; he accepted after successfully negotiating for a higher salary, though he was frustrated by Fields' close supervision.

Howells was made editor in 1871, after five years as assistant editor, and he remained in this position until 1881. In 1869, he met Mark Twain with whom he formed a longtime friendship. But his relationship with journalist Jonathan Baxter Harrison was more important for the development of his literary style and his advocacy of Realism. Harrison wrote a series of articles for The Atlantic Monthly during the 1870s on the lives of ordinary Americans. Howells gave a series of twelve lectures on "Italian Poets of Our Century" for the Lowell Institute during its 1870–71 season.

In September 1885, Henry Alden, the senior editor at Harper's, asked Howell to consider writing a new literary column for the magazine, called the Editor’s Study. Following a successful pilot, Howells agreed to write the column, on the condition that he be allowed to overrule objections from editors and advertisers. In addition to literary reviews, he would write on such contentious topics as "the question of modern civilization", "sex in literature", the Dred Scott Case, "the rise of psychologism", "race-patriotism", and "international government". He wrote his last Editor's Study column in March 1892, and shortly thereafter moved from Boston to New York to write for Cosmopolitan. After 1900, he would return to write the Editor's Easy Chair column for Harper's, which focused more explicitly on social issues.

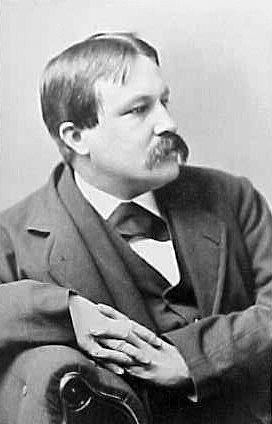
Howells circa 1870

Howells published his first novel Their Wedding Journey in 1872, but his literary reputation soared with the realist novel A Modern Instance (1882), which described the decay of a marriage. His 1885 novel The Rise of Silas Lapham became his best known work, describing the rise and fall of an American entrepreneur of the paint business. His social views were also strongly represented in the novels Annie Kilburn (1888), A Hazard of New Fortunes (1889), and An Imperative Duty (1891).

Howells was particularly outraged by the trials resulting from the Haymarket affair, which led him to portray a similar riot in A Hazard of New Fortunes and to write publicly to protest the trials of the men allegedly involved in the affair. In his public writing and in his novels, he drew attention to pressing social issues of the time. He joined the Anti-Imperialist League in 1898, in opposition to the U.S. annexation of the Philippines.

His poems were collected in 1873 and 1886, and a volume was published in 1895 under the title Stops of Various Quills. He was the initiator of the school of American realists, and he had little sympathy with any other type of fiction. However, he frequently encouraged new writers in whom he discovered new ideas or new fictional techniques, such as Stephen Crane, Frank Norris, Hamlin Garland, Harold Frederic, Abraham Cahan, Sarah Orne Jewett, and Paul Laurence Dunbar.

=== Later years ===
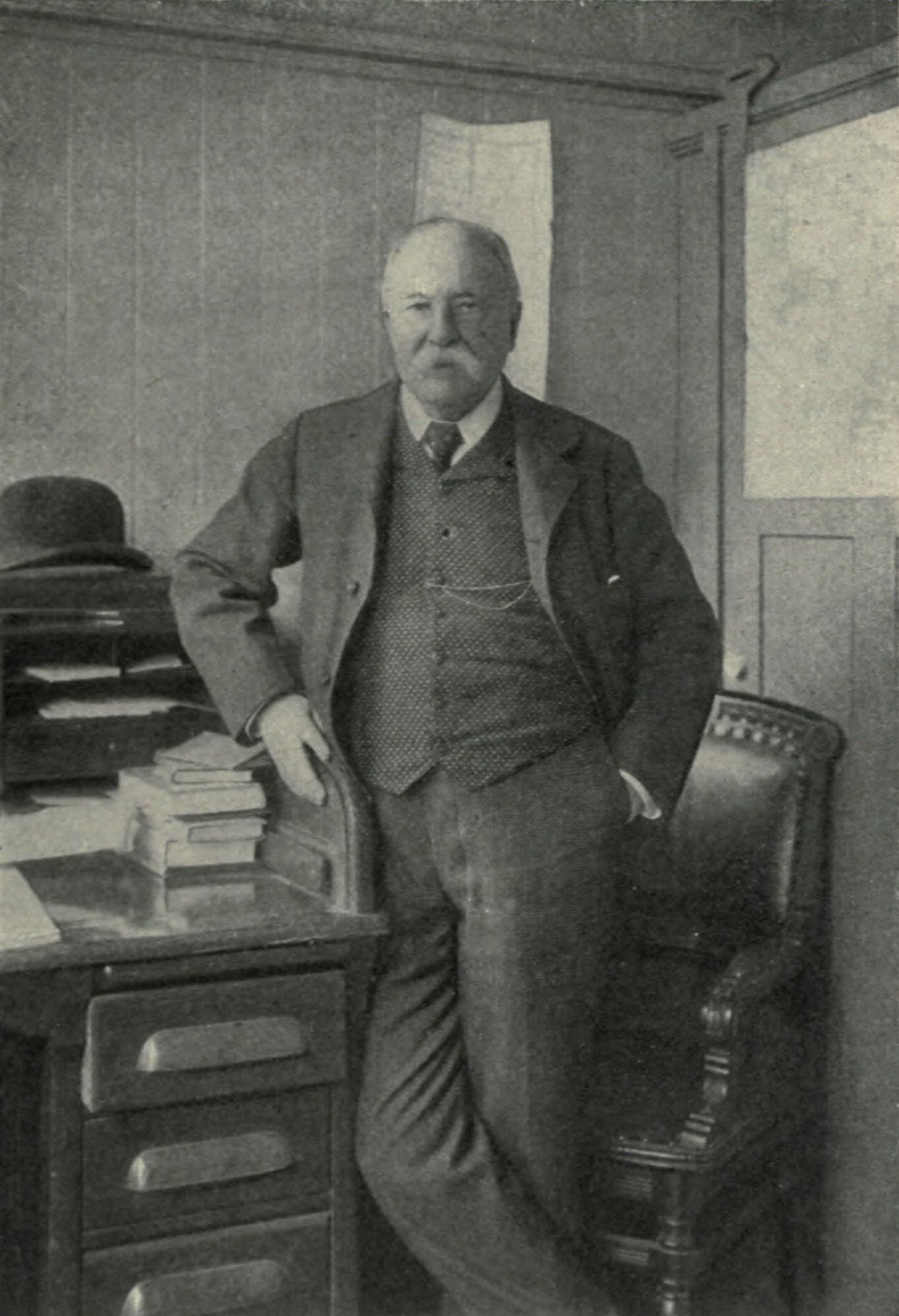
Howells in his home office, before 1902

In 1902, Howells published The Flight of Pony Baker, a book for children partly inspired by his own childhood. The same year, he bought a summer home overlooking the Piscataqua River in Kittery Point, Maine. He returned there annually until his wife's death, then left the house to his son and family and moved to a house in York Harbor. His grandson, John Noyes Mead Howells, donated the property to Harvard University as a memorial in 1979. In 1904 he was one of the first seven people chosen for membership in the American Academy of Arts and Letters, of which he became president.

Howells was present at the 1905 Portsmouth Peace Conference, and reported on it for Harper's Weekly.

In February 1910, Elinor Howells began using morphine to treat her worsening neuritis. She died on May 6, a few days after her birthday, and only two weeks after the death of Howells's friend Mark Twain. Henry James offered his condolences, writing "I think of this laceration of your life with an infinite sense of all it will mean for you". Howells and his daughter Mildred decided to spend part of the year in their Cambridge home on Concord Avenue; though, without Elinor, they found it "dreadful in its ghostliness and ghastliness".

Howells died in his sleep shortly after midnight on May 11, 1920, of influenza. Following a simple funeral held at the Church of the Ascension in Manhattan, officiated by his friend and fellow Christian Socialist the Rev. Percy Stickney Grant, Howells's body was cremated and was buried in Cambridge, Massachusetts. Eight years later his daughter published his correspondence as a biography of his literary life.

He was posthumously honored with a centennial birthday tribute, originated by the Ohio School of the Air and co-aired on NBC's Blue Network. On March 4, 1937, his adventure-drama biography, "The Dean Without a College", was presented by WLW's Crosley Players troupe.

== Literary criticism ==
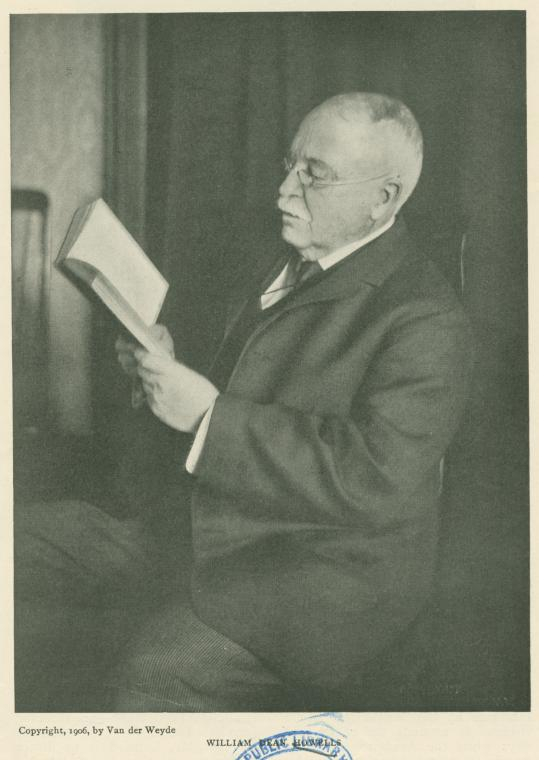
Howells in 1906

In addition to his own creative works, Howells wrote critical essays that helped establish in the United States the literary reputations of Henrik Ibsen, Émile Zola, Giovanni Verga, Benito Pérez Galdós, and, especially, Leo Tolstoy. He also wrote critically in support of American writers Hamlin Garland, Stephen Crane, Emily Dickinson, Mary E. Wilkins Freeman, Paul Laurence Dunbar, Sarah Orne Jewett, Charles W. Chesnutt, Abraham Cahan, Madison Cawein, and Frank Norris. In his "Editor's Study" column at The Atlantic Monthly and, later, at Harper's, he formulated and disseminated his theories of realism in literature.

Howells viewed realism as "nothing more and nothing less than the truthful treatment of material."

In defense of the real, as opposed to the ideal, he wrote,

I hope the time is coming when not only the artist, but the common, average man, who always 'has the standard of the arts in his power,' will have also the courage to apply it, and will reject the ideal grasshopper wherever he finds it, in science, in literature, in art, because it is not 'simple, natural, and honest,' because it is not like a real grasshopper. But I will own that I think the time is yet far off, and that the people who have been brought up on the ideal grasshopper, the heroic grasshopper, the impassioned grasshopper, the self-devoted, adventureful, good old romantic card-board grasshopper, must die out before the simple, honest, and natural grasshopper can have a fair field.

Howells believed the future of American writing was not in poetry but in novels, a form which he saw shifting from "romance" to a serious form.

Howells was a Christian socialist whose ideals were greatly influenced by Russian writer Leo Tolstoy. He joined a Christian socialist group in Boston between 1889 and 1891 and attended several churches, including the First Spiritual Temple and the Church of the Carpenter, the latter being affiliated with the Episcopal Church and the Society of Christian Socialists. These influences led him to write on issues of social justice from a moral and egalitarian point of view, being critical of the social effects of industrial capitalism. He was, however, not a Marxist.

== Reception ==
Howells enjoyed a very lofty reputation during his lifetime. Writing in 1906, Mark Twain considered Howells an exemplary writer, "without his peer in the English-writing world." Bliss Perry considered a knowledge of Howells's work to be vital for an understanding of the American provincial novel and believed that "he has never in his long career written an insincere, a slovenly, or an infelicitous page."

Howells's literary peers also commented on him in their private writings. The English novelist George Gissing read two of Howells's works, The Shadow of a Dream and A Fearful Responsibility, dismissing the latter in his diary as "inane triviality". In a letter to Howells, Henry James praised the truthful "documentary" aspect of Howells's work, which James described as an "exquisite notation of our whole democratic light and shade and give and take."

== Works ==
- Lives and Speeches of Abraham Lincoln and Hannibal Hamlin (New York, W. A. Townsend & Co.; Columbus, Follett, Foster & co., 1860).
- Venetian Life (London: N. Trübner & Co., 1866; later American edition with additional cancels: New York: Hurd and Houghton, 1866).
- Italian Journeys (New York: Hurd and Houghton, 1867).
- "No Love Lost," Putnam's Magazine, Vol. 2 (new series), No. 12, pp. 641–51 (December 1868). Reprinted as No Love Lost. A Romance of Travel (New York: G.P. Putnam & Son, 1869).
- Suburban Sketches (New York: Hurd and Houghton, 1871).
- Their Wedding Journey (Boston: J.R. Osgood & Co., 1872).
- A Chance Acquaintance (Boston: J.R. Osgood & Co., 1873).
- Sketch of the Life and Character of Rutherford B. Hayes (New York & Boston: Hurd and Houghton, [1876]).
- A Foregone Conclusion (Boston: J.R. Osgood & Co., 1875).
- A Day's Pleasure (Boston: J.R. Osgood & Co., 1876).
- The Parlor Car: A Farce (Boston: J.R. Osgood, 1876) (originally published in the September 1876 issue of The Atlantic Monthly).
- A Counterfeit Presentment: A Comedy (Boston: J.R. Osgood & Co., 1877).
- Out of the Question (Boston: J.R. Osgood & Co., 1877).
- The Lady of The Aroostook (Boston: Houghton Mifflin, 1879).

The following were written during his residence in England and in Italy, as was The Rise of Silas Lapham in 1885.

- The Undiscovered Country (Boston: Houghton, Mifflin & Co., 1880).
- A Modern Instance: A Novel (Boston: Houghton, Mifflin & Co., 1881).
- A Fearful Responsibility and Other Stories (Boston: J.R. Osgood & Co., 1881) (in addition to the title story: "At the Sign of the Savage" and "Tonelli's Marriage").
- Dr. Breen's Practice: A Novel (Boston & New York: Houghton, Mifflin & Co., 1881).
- A Day's Pleasure, and Other Sketches (Boston: Houghton, Mifflin & Co., 1881) (in addition to title story: "Buying a Horse," "Flitting," "The Mouse" and "A Year in a Venetian Palace").
- Out of the Question; and, At the Sign of the Savage (Edinburgh: D. Douglas, 1882) (The first story was first published in the February–April 1877 issue of Atlantic Monthly).
- A Woman's Reason: A Novel (Boston: J.R. Osgood & Co., [c1882] 1883).
- The Sleeping Car: A Farce (Boston: J.R. Osgood & Co., 1883).
- Niagara Revisited 12 Years after their Wedding Journey by the Hoosac Tunnel Route (Chicago: D. Dalziel, 1884) (Revision of piece from May 1883 issue of Atlantic Monthly).
- Three Villages (Boston: J.R. Osgood & Co., 1884).
- The Register: A Farce (Boston: J.R. Osgood & Co., 1884).
- Tuscan Cities (Boston: J.R. Osgood & Co., 1884).
- The Rise of Silas Lapham (Boston: Ticknor & Co., 1885).
- A Sea-Change, or, Love's Stowaway: A Comic Opera in Two Acts and an Epilogue (London: Trübner & Co.; Boston: A.P. Schmidt & Co., c1884).
- Poems (Boston: Ticknor, 1885).
- The Elevator: A Farce (Boston: Houghton, Mifflin & Co., 1885; 0James R. Osgood, c1886).

He returned to the United States in 1886. He wrote various types of works, including fiction, poetry, and farces, of which The Sleeping Car, The Mouse-Trap, The Elevator; Christmas Every Day; and Out of the Question are characteristic.

- Indian Summer (Boston: Ticknor & Co. 1885).
- The Garroters: A Farce (New York: Harper & Brothers, 1886).
- The Minister's Charge: or The Apprenticeship of Lemuel Barker (Boston: Houghton, Mifflin & Co., 1886).
- Modern Italian Poets: Essays and Versions (New York: Harper & Brothers, 1887).
- April Hopes: A Novel (Edinburgh: David Douglas 1887; New York: Harper & Brothers, 1888).
- with Thomas Sergeant Ferry (eds.), Library of Universal Adventure by Sea and Land including Original Narratives and Authentic Stories of Personal Prowess and Peril in All the Waters and Regions of the Globe from the Year 79 A.D. to the Year 1888 A.D. (New York: Harper & Bros., 1888).
- A Sea-Change: or, Love's Stowaway, a Lyricated Farce in Two Acts and an Epilogue (Boston: Ticknor & Company, 1888).
- with Mark Twain and Charles Hopkins Clark (comps.), Mark Twain's Library of Humor (New York: Charles L. Webster & Co., 1888).
- The Mouse-Trap and Other Farces (New York: Harper, 1889) (in addition to the title farce:The Garotters, Five o'Clock Tea, and A Likely Story).
- Annie Kilburn: A Novel (New York: Harper & Brothers, 1889).
- A Hazard of New Fortunes: A Novel (New York: Harper & Brothers / (Harper's Franklin square library: new ser, no. 661. Extra, Nov. 1889)).
- The Shadow of a Dream: A Story (New York: Harper & Brothers, 1890).
- A Boy's Town: described for "Harper's Young People" (New York: Harper & Brothers, 1890).
- An Imperative Duty (Author's ed.: Edinburgh: D. Douglas / (David Douglas' series of American authors, 54) 1891).
- Criticism and Fiction (New York: Harper & Brothers, 1891).
- The Quality of Mercy (New York; London: Harper, 1891).
- The Albany Depot (New York: Harper & Brothers, 1892 [i.e.1891]).
- A Little Swiss Sojourn (New York: Harper & Brothers / (Harper's black & white series), 1892).
- A Letter of Introduction: Farce (New York: Harper & Brothers / (Harper's black and white series), 1892).
- The World of Chance (New York: Harper & Brothers, 1893).
- The Unexpected Guest (New York: Harper & Brothers, 1893).
- My Year in a Log Cabin (New York: Harper & Brothers / (Harper's black and white series), 1893).
- Christmas Every Day and Other Stories Told to Children (New York: Harper & Brothers, 1893).
- The Coast of Bohemia: A Novel (New York: Harper & Brothers, 1893).
- Evening Dress: A Farce (New York: Harper & Brothers / (Harper's black and white series), 1893).
- A Traveler from Altruria: Romance (New York: Harper & Brothers, 1894).
- My Literary Passions (New York: Harper, 1895).
- Stops of Various Quills (New York: Harper & Brothers, 1895).
- A Parting and a Meeting: Story (New York: Harper & Brothers, 1896).
- Impressions and Experiences (New York: Harper & Brothers, 1896) (consisting of "The Country Printer," "Police Report," "I Talk of Dreams," "An East-Side Ramble," "Tribulations of a Cheerful Giver," "The Closing of the Hotel," "Glimpses of Central Park" and "New York Streets").
- Stories of Ohio (New York, Cincinnati: American Book Co., 1897).
- The Landlord at Lion's Head (Edinburg: David Douglas, 1897).
- An Open-Eyed Conspiracy: An Idyl of Saratoga (New York, London: Harper & Brothers, 1897).
- A Previous Engagement: Comedy (New York: Harper & Brothers, 1897).
- The Story of a Play: A Novel (New York, London: Harper & Brothers, 1898).
- Ragged Lady: A Novel (New York, London: Harper & Brothers, 1899).
- Their Silver Wedding Journey (New York, London: Harper & Brothers, 1899).
- An Indian Giver: A Comedy (Boston, New York: Houghton, Mifflin & Co., 1900).
- Bride Roses: A Scene (Boston: Houghton, Mifflin, 1900 [c1893]).
- Literary Friends and Acquaintance: A Personal Retrospect of American Authorship (New York, Harper & Brothers, 1900).
- Doorstep Acquaintance, and Other Sketches (Cambridge, Mass.: Houghton, Mifflin & Co., 1900) (in addition to title story: "Tonelli's Marriage," "A Romance of Real Life" and "At Padua").
- Room Forty-Five: A Farce (Boston, New York, Houghton, Mifflin, 1900).
- A Pair of Patient Lovers (New York, London: Harper & Brothers, 1901).
- Heroines of Fiction (New York, London: Harper & Brothers, 1901).
- The Kentons: A Novel (New York, London: Harper & Brothers, 1902).
- The Flight of Pony Baker: A Boy's Town Story (New York, London: Harper & Brothers, 1902).
- Literature and Life: Studies (New York, London: Harper & Brothers, 1902) (consisting of the following essays: "The Man of Letters as a Man of Business," "Worries of a Winter Walk," "Confessions of a Summer Colonist," "The Editor's Relations with the Young Contributor," "Summer Isles of Eden," "Wild Flowers of the Asphalt, "Last Days in a Dutch Hotel," "Some Anomalies of the Short Story," "A Circus in the Suburbs," "A She Hamlet," "Spanish Prisoners of War," "The Midnight Platoon," "The Beach at Rockaway," "American Literary Centres," "Sawdust in the Arena," "At a Dime Museum," "American Literature in Exile," "The Horse Show," "The Problem of the Summer," "Esthetic New York Fifty-Odd Years Ago," "From New York into New England," "The Standard Household-Effect Company," "Staccato Notes of a Vanished Summer," "The Art of the Adsmith," "The Psychology of Plagiarism," "Puritanism in American Fiction," "The What and the How in Art," "Politics of American Authors," "Storage' and "'Floating Down the River on the O-hi-o'").
- Letters Home (New York, London, Harper & Brothers, 1903).
- Questionable Shapes (New York, London, Harper & Brothers, 1903) (consisting of "His Apparition," "The Angel of the Lord" and "Though One Rose from the Dead).
- The Son of Royal Langbrith: A Novel (New York, London: Harper & Brothers, 1904).
- Miss Bellard's Inspiration: A Novel (New York, London: Harper & Brothers, 1905).
- London Films (New York, London: Harper & Brothers, 1905).
- Braybridge's Offer in William Dean Howells & Henry Mills Alden (eds.), Quaint Courtships: Harper's Novelettes (New York, London: Harper & Brothers, [1906]).
- The Amigo in William Dean Howells & Henry Mills Alden (eds.), The Heart of Childhood: Harper's Novelettes (New York, London: Harper & Brothers, 1906).
- Editha in William Dean Howells & Henry Mills Alden (eds.), Different Girls: Harper's Novelettes (New York, London: Harper & Brothers, 1906).
- The Mulberries in Pay's Garden (Cincinnati: Western Literary Press, 1906).
- Certain Delightful English Towns with Glimpses of the Pleasant Country Between (New York, London: Harper & Brothers, 1906).
- Between the Dark and the Daylight: Romances (New York, London: Harper & Brothers, 1907) (consisting of: "A Sleep and a Forgetting," "The Eidolons of Brooks Alford," "A Memory that Worked Overtime," "A Case of Metaphantasmia," "Editha," "Braybridge’s Offer" and "The Chick of the Easter Egg").
- Through the Eye of the Needle: A Romance (New York, London: Harper & Brothers, 1907).
- Roman Holiday and Others (New York, London: Harper & Brothers, 1908) (in addition to the title piece: ""Up and Down Medeira," "The Up-Town Blocks into Spain," "Ashore at Genoa," "Naples and Her Joyful Noise," "Pompeii Revisited," "A Week at Leghorn," "Over at Pisa," "Back at Genoa" and "Eden After the Fall").
- The Whole Family: A Novel by Twelve Authors (co-written) (New York, London: Harper & Brothers, 1908).
- Fennel and Rue: A Novel (New York, London: Harper & Brothers, 1908).
- Seven English Cities (New York, London: Harper & Brothers, 1909).
- The Mother and Father: Dramatic Passages (New York, London: Harper & Brothers, 1909).
- My Mark Twain: Reminiscences and Criticisms (New York, London: Harper & Brothers, 1910).
- Imaginary Interviews (New York, London: Harper & Brothers, 1910) (consisting of the following essays: "The Restoration of the Easy Chair by Way of Introduction, "A Year of Spring and a Life of Youth," "Sclerosis of the Tastes," "The Practices and Precepts of Vaudeville," "Intimations of Italian Opera," "The Superiority of Our Inferiors," "Unimportance of Women in Republics," "Having Just Got Home," "New York to the Home-Comer's Eye," "Cheapness of the Costliest City on Earth," "Ways and Means of Living in New York," "The Quality of Boston and the Quantity of New York," "The Whirl of Life in Our First Circles," "The Magazine Muse," "Comparative Luxuries of Travel," "Qualities without Defects," "A Wasted Opportunity," "A Niece's Literary Advice to Her Uncle," "A Search for Celebrity," "Practical Immortality on Earth," "Around a Rainy-Day Fire," "The Advantages of Quotational Criticism," "Reading for a Grandfather," "Some Moments with the Muse," "A Normal Hero and Heroine Out of Work," "Autumn in the Country and City," "Personal and Epistolary Addresses," "Dressing for Hotel Dinner," "The Counsel of Literary Age to Literary Youth," "The Unsatisfactoriness of Unfriendly Criticism," "The Fickleness of Age," "The Renewal of Inspiration," "The Summer Sojourn of Florindo and Lindora," "To Have the Honor of Meeting" and "A Day at Bronx Park").
- "A Counsel of Consolation" in In After Days: Thoughts on the Future Life (New York, London: Harper & Brothers, 1910).
- Parting Friends: A Farce (New York, London: Harper & Brothers, 1911).
- New Leaf Mills: A Chronicle (New York, London: Harper & Brothers, 1913).
- Familiar Spanish Travels (New York, London: Harper & Brothers, 1913).
- Seen and Unseen at Stratford-upon-Avon: A Fantasy (New York, London: Harper & Brothers, 1914).
- The Leatherwood God (New York: The Century Co., 1916).
- The Daughter of the Storage, and Other Things in Prose and Verse (New York, London: Harper & Brothers, 1916) (in addition to the title story: "A Presentiment," "Captain Dunlevy's Last Trip," "The Return to FavorSomebody's Mother," "The Face at the Window," "An Experience," "The Boarders," "Breakfast Is My Best Meal," "The Mother-Bird," "The Amigo," "Black Cross Farm," "The Critical Bookstore," "A Feast of Reason," "City and Country in the Fall," "Table Talk," "The Escapade of a Grandfather," "Self-sacrifice: A Farce-tragedy" and "The Night before Christmas").
- Years of My Youth (New York, London: Harper & Brothers, 1916).
- "Eighty Years and After," Harper's Monthly Magazine, Vol. CXL, No. DCCXXXV (December 1919), pp. 21–28.
- The Vacation of the Kelwyns: An Idyl of the Middle Eighteen-Seventies (New York, London: Harper & Brothers, 1920).
- Hither and Thither in Germany (New York, London: Harper & Brothers, 1920).
- Mrs. Farrell: A Farce (New York, London: Harper & Brothers, 1921) (first printed as "Private Theatricals [Part I]," Atlantic Monthly, Vol. XXXVI, No. CCXVII (November 1875), pp. 513–22 and "Private Theatricals [Part II]," Atlantic Monthly, Vol. XXXVI, Nol. CCXVIII (December 1875), pp. 674–87).

== See also ==
- William Dean Howells House, Cambridge, Massachusetts
- Redtop, his home in Belmont, Massachusetts
- American realism
