= A Crystal Age =

1887 novel by William Henry Hudson

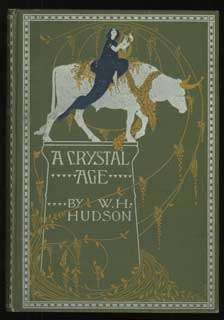
- 1906 Edition
- Author: W. H. Hudson
- Language: English
- Genre: Utopian fiction Science fiction Belles-lettres
- Publisher: T. Fisher Unwin
- Publication date: 1887
- Publication place: United Kingdom
- Media type: Print (Hardcover)
- Pages: 287 pp.

A Crystal Age is a utopian novel/Dystopia written by W. H. Hudson, first published in 1887. It concerns an inadvertent time traveler facing the challenge of assimilating into and finding love in an enigmatic future society. The book has been called a "significant S-F milestone" and has been noted for its anticipation of the "modern ecological mysticism" that would evolve a century later.

The book was first issued anonymously in 1887. The second edition of 1906 identified the author by name, and included a preface by Hudson. The third edition of 1916 added a foreword by Clifford Smith.

== Genre ==
Hudson's second novel was one element in the major wave of utopian and dystopian literature that characterized the final decades of the 19th century and the start of the 20th, in Great Britain and the United States.

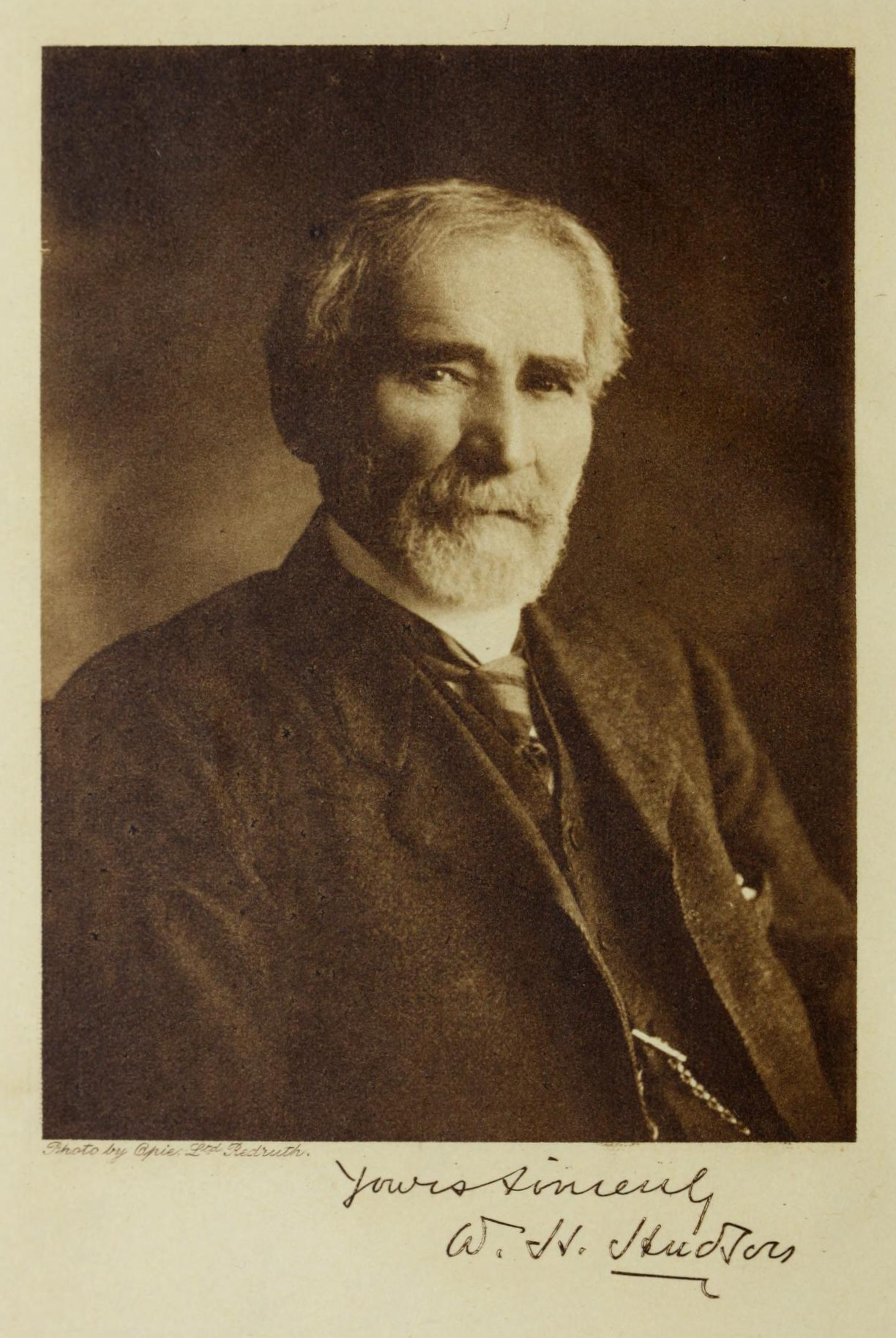
W.H. [William Henry] Hudson

=== Pastoral ===
Whether they wrote fiction or non-fiction, most utopian writers of Hudson's generation placed a strong emphasis on technological progress as a way to a better future; examples range from Edward Bellamy's Looking Backward (1888) to King Gillette's The Human Drift (1894) to Alexander Craig's Ionia (1898) to H. G. Wells's A Modern Utopia (1905). Conversely, though, a minority of utopian writers reacted with a skepticism toward, or even a rejection of, technological progress, and favored a return to an agrarian simplicity; these "pastoral utopias" included William Morris's News from Nowhere (1891) and the "Altrurian trilogy" of William Dean Howells, his A Traveler from Altruria (1894) and its sequels.

Hudson's A Crystal Age belongs securely in the latter category of pastoral utopia. The people of his imagined future possess only one piece of technology, a system of "brass globes" that produces a form of ambient music. Otherwise they have no machines and only simple devices; they plow their fields with horses and use axes to chop down trees.

=== Apocalypse ===
Another subgenre of the utopian literature has been termed the "apocalyptic utopia." These books anticipate a disastrous future, usually as a precursor of a later, superior phase of human development. Hudson's book follows this approach; he envisions the modern society he knew as eventually collapsing into chaos through its hubris – "For in their madness they hoped by knowledge to gain absolute dominion over nature". Modern "pride and folly" lead to "corruption and decay;" a global disaster follows,

...a sort of mighty Savonarola bonfire, in which most of the things once valued have been consumed to ashes – politics, religions, systems of philosophy, isms and ologies of all descriptions; schools, churches, prisons, poorhouses; stimulants and tobacco, kings and parliaments; cannon with its hostile roar, and pianos that thundered peacefully; history, the press, vice, political economy, money, and a million things more – all consumed like so much worthless hay and stubble.

A "small remnant" of humanity rebuilds on a more "humble" basis. Hudson sets his story more than a "hundred centuries" into a new, saner, and more balanced human culture.

== Style ==
As with his other books, Hudson wrote A Crystal Age in a highly descriptive style. He paints detailed word-pictures. In the palatial residence of the people of the new age, "a room of vast extent" has

...something ethereal in its aspect, as of a nave in a cloud-cathedral, its far-stretching shining floors and walls and columns, pure white and pearl-gray, faintly touched with colors of exquisite delicacy. And over it all was the roof of white or pale gray glass tinged with golden-rod – the roof which I had seen from the outside when it seemed to me like a cloud resting on the stony summit of a hill.

Toward the end of the book, the narrator applies a dusk metaphor to his declining mood: "All my thoughts, like evening clouds that appear luminous and rich in color until the sun has set, began to darken with a mysterious gloom." From there he proceeds to an evocative description of the late-autumn world around him:

For a long time the sky had been overcast with multitudes and endless hurrying processions of wild-looking clouds – torn, wind-chased fugitives, of every mournful shade of color, from palest gray to slatey-black; and storms of rain had been frequent, impetuous, and suddenly intermitted, or passing away phantom-like towards the misty hills, there to lose themselves among other phantoms, ever wandering sorrowfully in that vast, shadowy borderland where earth and heaven mingled; and gusts of wind which, as they roared by over a thousand straining trees and passed off with hoarse, volleying sounds, seemed to mimic the echoing thunder.

Much of the prose throughout the book is equally lush.

== Synopsis ==
The narrator, "Smith", tells his story in the first person. A traveler and amateur naturalist, he regains consciousness "under a heap of earth and stones" and believes that he had been knocked unconscious in a fall – though his thoughts and recollections are confused. He is astounded to discover that he is entwined in the roots of plants, as though they have been growing around him. Extricating himself and surveying the scene, he sees a great house in the distance, and walks toward it to seek help and information. On his way, he encounters a funeral: a group of strangely yet strikingly dressed people, led by a majestic white-bearded old man, are interring a corpse in a grave. The narrator is especially struck by a beautiful girl who is overcome by grief. She appears to be about 14 years old; though, he soon learns that this world, and everyone in it are far older than they appear. He becomes enchanted by her, and falls in love. The funeral party see him, and express surprise at his presence and his odd uncouth clothes and boots; but they allow him to accompany them to the enormous mansion where they live.

Enthralled with the girl (her name is Yoletta), and anxious to show his worth in their House, the narrator agrees to work for a year as a probationer in this community. He is constantly stumbling into misunderstandings with his new companions, for the world seems to have changed in so many extreme and incomprehensible ways. The most basic concepts of his society are unknown to these people. When he inquires about the nearest city, the old man who is "the Father of the House" thinks he is talking about a beehive. When the narrator notes that they share the English language, he is again not understood; the people of the house think they speak "the language of human beings – that is all." (Though their spoken language has changed little, the writing system is altered so much that the narrator cannot read the "Hebrew-like characters" in which their books are written.) It seems that the entire human race is now organized into communal houses like this one, with no other form of social structure, that they know of.

The narrator struggles to adapt to this new society, as he pursues Yoletta. He is shocked to learn that all the people are much older than they appear; Yoletta is 31 years old, and the Father of the House is nearly 200. They are vegetarians, and have a strong rapport with the animals in their environment. The narrator is struck by their "rare physical beauty," their "crystal purity of heart," "ever contented and calmly glad". Yet he wonders why they have no romantic interests, and why there are no children in the community. He sometimes falls afoul of the strict rules, in which lying is a serious offense, punishable by solitary confinement. Yoletta comes to love him, but like a brother, without the heat of passion he feels for her.

In time he meets the mysterious Mother of the House, and begins to comprehend the full strangeness and differentness of their way of life. The humans of this distant future have achieved their utopian state by abandoning sexuality and romantic love. Like a beehive, or a wolf pack, only the Queen, or Alpha Male and Female, or Father and Mother of the House, in this case, reproduce. The rest of the House live communally, as siblings. The narrator despairs when he realizes that his passion for Yoletta can never be consummated; and, wonders whether he can adapt to this mode of living. He does not realize that the Mother has begun the long process of grooming himself and Yoletta to become the new Father and Mother of the House.

When he is in the library, he discovers an elaborately carved bottle on a shelf; its inscription states that its contents provide a cure for the oppressions of "time and disease" and the thoughts or passions that "lead to madness." He takes a dose of the liquid, thinking it will cure his passion for Yoletta, which he doesn't realize she has begun to learn to reciprocate. It is only when his body grows stiff and cold that he realizes that the potion is a poison, and that the only relief from the pains of life it provides is death.

This story, of a traveler who falls in love with a mysterious, beautiful young girl with an elderly protector, anticipates the plot of Hudson's later and more famous 1904 novel, Green Mansions, and its young forest-dwelling character, Rima.

== Utopian context ==
The utopian literature of Hudson's generation was strongly preoccupied with the prospect of altered gender roles and related issues; A Crystal Age conforms to this general tendency. Like Addison Peale Russell in Sub-Coelum (1893) and Alexander Craig in Ionia (1898), Hudson foresees a world of emotional and sexual repression. His narrator rebels against this staid world he encounters, with an urge to "repeople the peaceful world with struggling, starving millions, as in the past," as the author writes in the Preface, Nature abhors a vacuum, and the Victorian sedate world of manners, and repression, proposed as the only alternative to a Malthusian over-population catastrophe (like in the later Soylent Green) will only lead to a fetid stagnation, and ultimately, depopulation, and death, of the species.

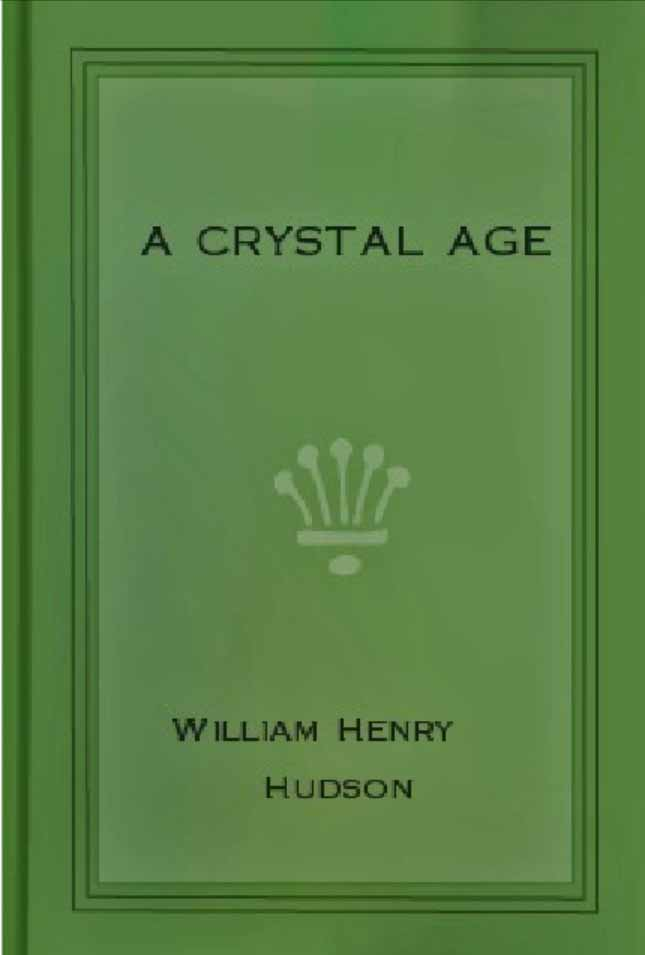
Reprint Cover

Like Hudson's A Crystal Age, Elizabeth Corbett's 1889 novel New Amazonia also addresses a 19th-century man's difficulties in adapting to a proposed future society in which the gender equation has changed radically.
