= The Milltillionaire =

1895 novel by Albert Waldo Howard

- Author: Albert Waldo Howard (as "M. Auberré Hovorré")
- Language: English
- Genre: Speculative fiction Utopian fiction Science fiction
- Publisher: Privately printed
- Publication date: c. 1895
- Publication place: United States
- Media type: Print

The Milltillionaire, or Age of Bardization is a work of utopian fiction written by Albert Waldo Howard, and published under the pseudonym "M. Auberré Hovorré." The book was one element in the major wave of utopian and dystopian literature that characterized the final decades of the nineteenth century.

== Date ==
The first edition of the book, published in Boston, was undated. It is generally assigned to c. 1895; a second, slightly revised edition was also undated, but likely appeared c. 1898.

== Genre ==
Writers of speculative fiction in the later 1800s (as at other times) varied in the approaches they took toward the nearer and farther future. Some novels took a short-term look ahead in time, from 25 years, as in Peck's The World a Department Store, to a century or more (Brooks's Earth Revisited, or Bellamy's Looking Backward). Others took a longer look ahead, of even thousands of years (as with Macnie's The Diothas). Howard similarly took a long though indefinite prospective view, setting his utopia at an unspecified time in the distant future.

Howard's book, like other utopian works that speculate on future technologies, encompasses some elements of science fiction. In his future, space travel has been achieved, and Jupiter explored; its natives are humanoid, large, and naked.

== Howard's future ==
Howard's future society is called the Bardic State. It is ruled by 26 bards called the Alphabets, half men and half women. Their leader is the Bard Regent, who appoints other officials; there is also the "Positive Poet," the "true poet," who is "the Milltillionaire." (Howard never fully defines or clarifies these titles and distinctions, though the Milltillionaire is "a being of such colossal and illimitable wealth and power, one might say he was a very god....") A powerful state apparatus supplies the needs of the people, who labor in return for "Universal Welfare," without money, crime, taxes, or personal property. Citizens have serial numbers.

The people live in twenty enormous circular cities, which have radii of a hundred miles; there are triple-decker highways and monorails. The capital, "Bardo-Cito-Uno" (which was Boston), has fully a quadrillion inhabitants. The countryside beyond these megalopolises is kept verdant and park-like. College education is universal, and is followed by a three-year vacation, then graduate school. The people are vegetarians (Howard even provides an illustrative menu); they practice free love. They dress simply; since they don't carry money, their outfits have only a single pocket, for their handkerchiefs. They communicate telepathically (as, indeed, do the Jupiterians). Hypnotism has been replaced by knowledge of the "psycho-omni-magnetic force."

Electricity has largely been replaced by magnetism (in some indefinite way), though electric vehicles are used along with bicycles. The power system exploits the "calorico-electrico-ether." Aircraft travel at 10,000 miles per hour. The weather is controlled.

== Mega-cities ==
The idea of the gigantic city was in the air at the time Howard wrote. In 1894, the year before Howard issued his first edition of The Milltillionaire, King Gillette had published his first utopian work, The Human Drift. In that book, Gillette proposed an enormous metropolis near Niagara Falls for tens of millions of residents, surrounded by a preserved natural environment.

== Assessment ==
The Milltillionaire has been called "A very unusual work. The author succeeds, as very few others have, of conveying the notion of the immensity of the future and the mind-boggling rise in technology. Yet the book is not completely rational. It is as eccentric as can be, but very interesting ideas are buried amidst the disorganization."

== See also ==
- Arqtiq
- The Great Romance
- Sub-Coelum
