= Young West =

1894 novel by Solomon Schindler

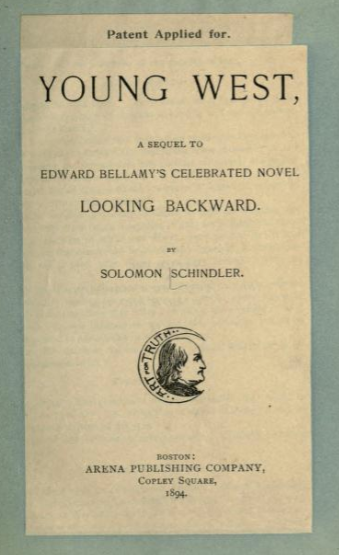
- Title page for Young West: A Sequel to Edward Bellamy's Celebrated Novel LOOKING BACKWARD (1894)
- Author: Solomon Schindler
- Language: English
- Genre: Utopian fiction Science fiction
- Publisher: Arena Publishing Co.
- Publication date: 1894
- Publication place: United States
- Media type: Print (Hardcover)
- Pages: 283 pp.

Young West: A Sequel to Edward Bellamy's Celebrated Novel "Looking Backward" is an 1894 utopian novel, written by Solomon Schindler, radical rabbi of Boston. As its subtitle indicates, the book was one of the many responses and sequels to Edward Bellamy's famous 1888 novel Looking Backward, and was one volume in the major wave of utopian and dystopian writing that distinguished the later nineteenth century.

Schindler had earlier translated Looking Backward into German (1890). His sequel was printed by the Arena Publishing Company, a prominent radical house of the 1890s; Schindler and publisher B. O. Flower served together on the board of directors of the American Psychical Society. Flower was responsible for one curious aspect of the book's first edition: he believed that the black-on-white contrast of standard printing caused eyestrain, and decided that the pages of Young West would have colored margins, in blue, green, and yellow.

Schindler's sequel follows upon the plot of Bellamy's original: protagonist Julian West marries heroine Edith Lette, and they soon have a son. Yet West senior dies only two years after his awakening in the year 2000; "Schindler's fictional response was in many ways more sophisticated than the responses of most twentieth-century critics who ignore or downplay West's anguish at the conclusion of Looking Backward." Schindler's book follows the development of the son, "young West," from early youth to eventual triumph, when, after a rigorous campaign, he wins election to the presidency of the United States.

Schindler's book diverges from Bellamy's original, in that where Bellamy placed strong emphasis on religion, Schindler's attitude is agnostic. (Schindler had already moved away from traditional Judaism; after a brief flirtation with spiritualism around 1892, he became a firm skeptic.) Bellamy thought that socialism would arise first in America, while Schindler expected Europe to be first; he foresaw the weakening of European nationalism and wholesale intermarriage among Europeans.

Schindler's book helps to illustrate the wide reach of the utopian literature of its era. While many books in the genre were authored by White Anglo-Saxon Protestant males, other works were created by Jewish, Irish (Ignatius Donnelly's Caesar's Column and The Golden Bottle), and African-American (Sutton E. Griggs's Imperium in Imperio) writers, and by a number of women.
