= 1894 in literature =

This article contains information about the literary events and publications of 1894.

== Events ==
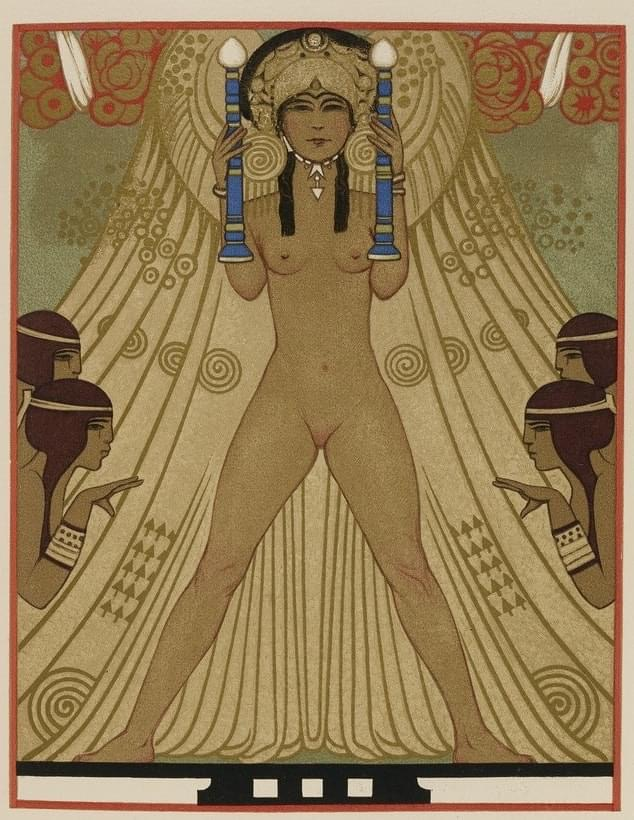
Illustration for Salome, by Manuel Orazi

- February – Oscar Wilde's play Salome is first published in English, with illustrations by Aubrey Beardsley.
- February 15 – French anarchist Martial Bourdin accidentally kills himself while attempting to plant a bomb at the Royal Observatory, Greenwich. A fictionalised version of the death appears in Joseph Conrad's novel The Secret Agent (1907).
- Early Spring – Mary Antin emigrates from White Russia (Belarus) to the United States with her mother.
- April – The Yellow Book imprint, edited by Henry Harland, begins publication by John Lane and Elkin Mathews – The Bodley Head – in London.
- April 21 – George Bernard Shaw's play Arms and the Man is premièred at the Avenue Theatre in London.
- May – The Scottish writer William Sharp publishes Pharais, his first novel under the pseudonym Fiona MacLeod.
- June – The German novelist Hermann Hesse begins an apprenticeship in mechanical engineering at a factory in Calw.
- August 15 – A. E. Waite starts to publish and edit an occult periodical, The Unknown World.
- October – Lafcadio Hearn begins work as a journalist for the English-language Kobe Chronicle in Japan.
- November 8 – Robert Frost's first poem, "My Butterfly" appears in The New York Independent, which pays him $15.
- December
  - An abridgement of Stephen Crane's American Civil War novel The Red Badge of Courage is first published as a serial in The Philadelphia Press.
  - Arthur Conan Doyle publishes "An Alpine Pass on "Ski"" in The Strand Magazine (London), popularizing skiing as a sport in Switzerland.
- December 22 – Claude Debussy's symphonic poem Prélude à l'après-midi d'un faune, a free interpretation of Stéphane Mallarmé's 1876 poem, "L'Après-midi d'un faune", is premièred in Paris.
- unknown dates
  - The U.K. circulating libraries of Mudie's and WHSmith cease to purchase three-volume novels, killing off the format.
  - J. M. Dent begins in London to publish Temple Shakespeare pocket editions, edited by Israel Gollancz.
  - The Century Roman typeface, first of the Century type family, is cut by American Type Founders' designer Linn Boyd Benton, originally for Theodore Low De Vinne's The Century Magazine.

== New books ==
=== Fiction ===
- Gabriele D'Annunzio – Il trionfo della morte (The Triumph of Death)
- Clementina Black – The Agitator
- Léon Bloy – Disagreeable Tales
- Mary Elizabeth Braddon – The Christmas Hirelings
- Walter Browne – 2894
- Hall Caine
  - The Mahdi; or Love and Race, A Drama in Story
  - The Manxman
- Anton Chekhov – "The Student" («Студент», published in Russkiye Vedomosti, April)
- Kate Chopin
  - Bayou Folk
  - "The Story of an Hour"
- Ella Hepworth Dixon – The Story of a Modern Woman
- Arthur Conan Doyle – The Memoirs of Sherlock Holmes (collection)
- George du Maurier – Trilby (serialization in Harper's Monthly Magazine)
- Marcellus Emants – Een Nagelaten Bekentenis (A Posthumous Confession)
- Theodor Fontane – Effi Briest (begins serialization in Deutsche Rundschau)
- Mary E. Wilkins Freeman – Pembroke
- George Gissing – In the Year of Jubilee
- Katharine Glasier (as Katharine Conway) – Husband & Brother, a few chapters in a woman's life of to-day
- H. Rider Haggard – The People of the Mist
- Knut Hamsun – Pan
- Thomas Hardy – Life's Little Ironies (collection of short stories)
- Robert Hichens – The Green Carnation
- William Dean Howells – A Traveler from Altruria
- Juhan Liiv – "Vari" ("The Shadow")
- Arthur Machen – The Great God Pan (in book form, with "The Innermost Light")
- Ian Maclaren – Beside the Bonnie Brier Bush
- George A. Moore – Esther Waters
- William Morris – The Wood Beyond the World
- Gustavus W. Pope – Journey to Mars
- Bolesław Prus – The New Woman (Emancypantki; book publication)
- Jules Renard – Poil de carotte (Carrot Head)
- Solomon Schindler – Young West
- Stendhal – Lucien Leuwen
- Hermann Sudermann – The Undying Past (Es war)
- Robert Louis Stevenson and Lloyd Osbourne – The Ebb-Tide
- Mark Twain
  - Pudd'nhead Wilson
  - Tom Sawyer Abroad
- Jules Verne – Captain Antifer
- Mary Augusta Ward – Marcella
- H. G. Wells – "The Red Room"
- Emma Wolf – A Prodigal in Love
- Israel Zangwill – The Bachelors' Club
- Émile Zola – Lourdes

=== Children and young people ===
- Harold Avery
  - The Orderly Officer
  - The School's Honour
- R. D. Blackmore – Perlycross
- Anthony Hope
  - The Dolly Dialogues
  - The Prisoner of Zenda
- Rudyard Kipling – The Jungle Book
- E. Nesbit – Miss Mischief
- Talbot Baines Reed – Tom, Dick and Harry
- Margaret Marshall Saunders – Beautiful Joe
- Ethel Turner – Seven Little Australians

=== Drama ===
- Wilson Barrett – The Manxman (adapted from Hall Caine's novel)
- William Gillette – Too Much Johnson (adapted from Maurice Ordonneau's La Plantation Thomassin)
- Martin Greif – Agnes Bernauer, der Engel von Augsburg
- Sydney Grundy
  - A Bunch of Violets
  - An Old Jew
- Henry Arthur Jones – The Case of Rebellious Susan
- Josef Lauff – Ignez de Castro
- Maurice Maeterlinck – The Death of Tintagiles (La Mort de Tintagiles, for marionette performance)
- Marc-André Raffalovich and John Gray – The Blackmailers
- Victorien Sardou – Gismonda
- George Bernard Shaw – Arms and the Man

=== Poetry ===
- Bliss Carman – Low Tide on Grande Pre: A Book Of Lyrics
- Pierre Louÿs – Songs of Bilitis
- Rainer Maria Rilke – Leben und Lieder

=== Non-fiction ===
- John Bartlett (comp.) – A Complete Concordance or verbal index to words, phrases and passages in the dramatic Works of Shakespeare
- Edward Carpenter – Homogenic Love and Its Place in a Free Society
- Christabel Rose Coleridge – The Daughters Who Have not Revolted (essays)
- Francis Darwin (with E. H. Acton) – The Practical Physiology of Plants
- King Gillette – The Human Drift
- Karl Marx – Das Kapital (vol. 3, published by Friedrich Engels)
- Leo Tolstoy – The Kingdom of God Is Within You («Царство Божіе внутри васъ», Tsárstvo Bózhiye vnutrí vas)

== Births ==
- January 1 – Aurora Nilsson, Swedish writer (died 1972)
- January 22 – Charles Langbridge Morgan, English novelist and dramatist (died 1958)
- February 6 – Eric Partridge, New Zealand/British lexicographer (died 1979)
- February 28 – Ben Hecht, American playwright and screen writer (died 1964)
- March 14 – Nichita Smochină, Transnistrian Romanian ethnographer and journalist (died 1980)
- March 17 – Paul Green, American novelist and Pulitzer Prize winning playwright (died 1981)
- March 23 – Mark Slonim, Russian literary historian and critic (died 1976)
- April 6 – Elinor M. Brent-Dyer, English children's writer (died 1969)
- April 7 – A. A. Thomson, English cricket and travel writer (died 1968)
- May 1 – Elizabeth Johanna Bosman, South African author who wrote under the pen name Marie Linde (d. 1963)
- May 27
  - Louis-Ferdinand Céline, French novelist and pamphleteer (died 1961)
  - Dashiell Hammett, American detective fiction writer (died 1961)
- June 14 – W. W. E. Ross, Canadian geophysicist and Imagist poet (died 1966)
- June 15 – Trygve Gulbranssen, Norwegian novelist, businessman and journalist (died 1962)
- June 28 – Allardyce Nicoll, British literary scholar (died 1976)
- July 8 – Claude-Henri Grignon, Canadian novelist, journalist and politician (died 1976)
- July 9 – Phelps Putnam, American poet (died 1948)
- July 18 – Isaac Babel, Ukrainian writer (died 1940)
- July 26 – Aldous Huxley, English novelist and poet (died 1963)
- July 30 – Păstorel Teodoreanu, Romanian poet and satirist (died 1964)
- August 31 – Albert Facey, Australian autobiographer (died 1982)
- September 2 – Joseph Roth, Austrian novelist
- September 6 – Howard Pease, American maritime adventure novelist (died 1974)
- September 19 – Rachel Field, American author and poet (died 1942)
- September 23 – Momčilo Nastasijević, Serbian poet, novelist and dramatist (died 1938)
- October 4 – Frans G. Bengtsson, Swedish novelist, essayist, poet and biographer (died 1954)
- October 9 – Agnes von Krusenstjerna, Swedish writer (died 1940)
- October 14 – E. E. Cummings, American poet (died 1962)
- October 18 – H. L. Davis, American fiction writer, Pulitzer Prize winning novelist and poet (died 1960)
- October 26 – Eugene Jolas, American writer, literary translator and critic (died 1952)
- December 8 – James Thurber, American cartoonist and humorous writer (died 1961)
- December 26
  - Håkon Evjenth, Norwegian children's writer (died 1951)
  - Jean Toomer (Nathan Eugene Pinchback Toomer), African American writer (died 1967)
- December 31 – Hong Shen (洪深), Chinese dramatist (died 1955)

== Deaths ==
- January 7 – Sophia Alice Callahan, American Muscogee novelist and teacher (born 1868)
- February 8 – R. M. Ballantyne, Scottish novelist for youth (born 1825)
- April 8
  - Bankim Chandra Chatterjee, Bengali writer and poet (born 1838)
  - Harriet Anne Scott, Scottish novelist (born 1819)
- April 12 – Ludwig Pfau, German poet, journalist, and revolutionary (born 1821)
- April 14 – Adolf Friedrich von Schack, German poet, literary historian and art collector (born 1815)
- April 29 – Augusta Theodosia Drane, English religious writer and biographer (born 1823)
- May 6 – Fanny Murdaugh Downing, American author and poet (born 1831)
- May 7
  - Frances Elizabeth Barrow, American juvenile literature author (born 1822)
  - Marie Sophie Schwartz, Swedish novelist (born 1819)
- May 19 – Caroline M. Sawyer, American poet, writer, and editor (born 1812)
- May 20 – Edmund Yates, Scottish novelist and dramatist (born 1831)
- June 5 – Edward Capern, English poet (born 1819)
- July 30 – Walter Pater, English essayist, critic and novelist (born 1839)
- August 6 – Otto Müller, German novelist (born 1816)
- August 10 – Cynthia Roberts Gorton, American poet and author (born 1826)
- August 25 – Celia Laighton Thaxter, American author (born 1835)
- October 8 – Oliver Wendell Holmes, American poet and physician (born 1809)
- October 20 – James Anthony Froude, English historian, novelist and biographer (born 1818)
- December 3 – Robert Louis Stevenson, Scottish novelist, poet and travel writer (born 1850)
- December 9 – Mary Bell Smith, American writer, educator, social reformer (born 1818)
- December 29 – Christina Rossetti, English poet (born 1830)
- Unknown dates
  - Giuseppe Borrello, Sicilian poet (born 1820)
  - Nabagopal Mitra, Indian playwright, poet and essayist (born c. 1840)

== Awards ==
- Newdigate Prize – Frank Taylor
