= New Amazonia =

1889 novel by Elizabeth Burgoyne Corbett

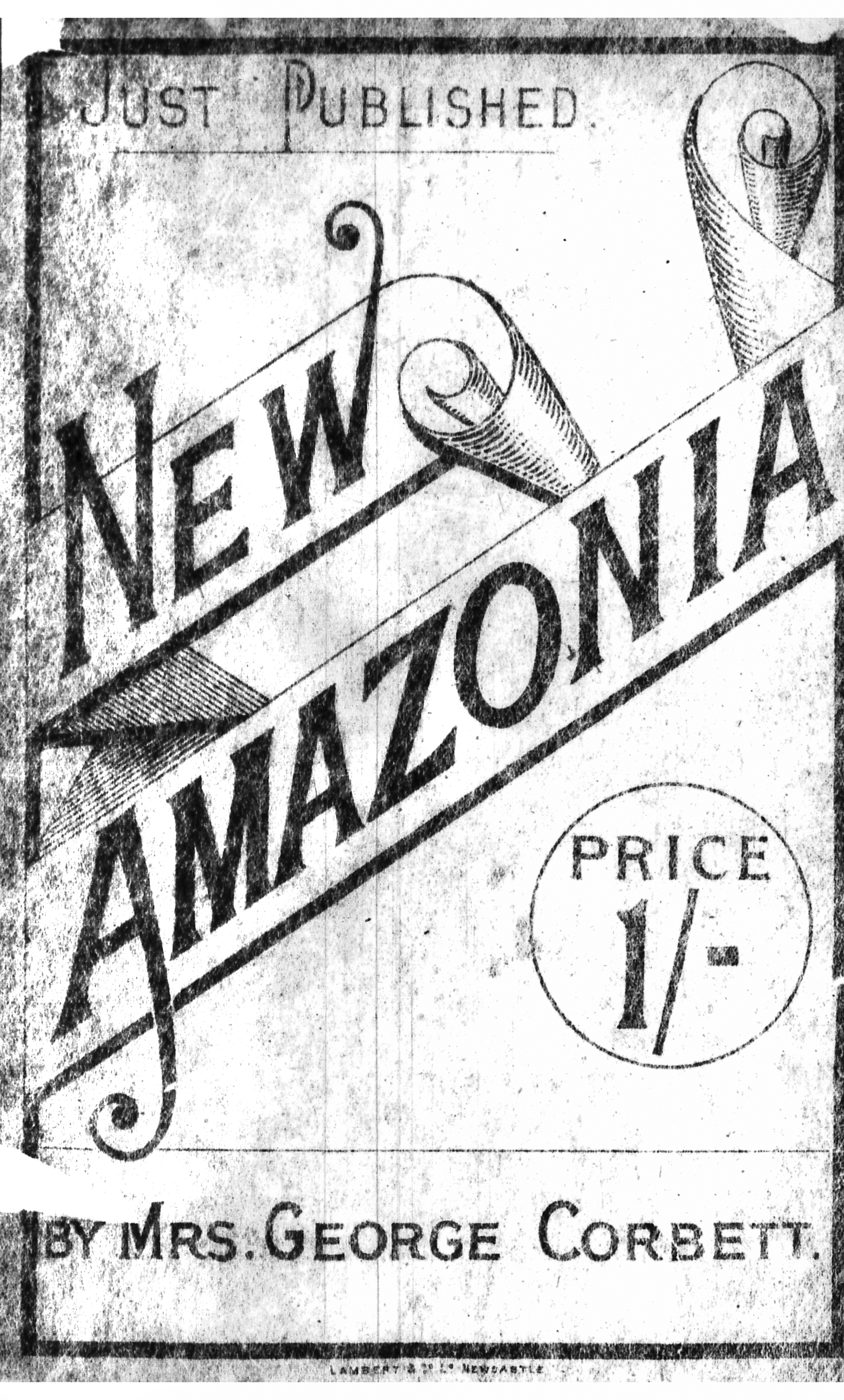
- Author: Elizabeth Burgoyne Corbett ("Mrs. George Corbett")
- Original title: New Amazonia: A Foretaste of the Future
- Language: English
- Genre: Utopian fiction Speculative fiction Science fiction
- Publisher: Tower Publishing Co.
- Publication date: 1889
- Publication place: United Kingdom
- Media type: Print (Hardcover)

New Amazonia: A Foretaste of the Future is a feminist utopian novel, written by Elizabeth Burgoyne Corbett and first published in 1889. It was one element in the wave of utopian and dystopian literature that marked the later nineteenth and early twentieth centuries.

== Context ==
Corbett wrote the novel in response to Mrs Humphry Ward's "An Appeal Against Female Suffrage", an open letter published in The Nineteenth Century and signed by over a hundred other women against the extension of Parliamentary suffrage to women.

== Plot ==
In her novel, Corbett envisions a successful suffragette movement eventually giving rise to a breed of highly evolved "Amazonians" who turn Ireland into a utopian society. The book's female narrator wakes up in the year 2472, much like Julian West awakens in the year 2000 in Edward Bellamy's Looking Backward (1888). Corbett's heroine, however, is accompanied by a man of her own time, who has similarly awakened from a hashish dream to find himself in New Amazonia.

The Victorian woman and man are given an account of intervening history by one of the Amazonians. In the early twentieth century, war between Britain and Ireland decimated the Irish population; the British repopulated the island with their own surplus women. (After the war, which also involved Germany allied with Britain and France on the side of Ireland, British women outnumbered men by three to one.) Women came to dominate all aspects of society on the island, and through their superior abilities created a utopia.

The history lesson is followed by a tour of the new society, which embodies a totalitarian version of state socialism. Men are allowed to live on the island, but cannot hold political office: "masculine government has always held openings for the free admission of corruption, injustice, immorality, and narrow-minded, self-glorifying bigotry." State offices and important professional posts are also restricted to the never-married. The Amazonians are vegetarians, and the state ensures that only healthful foods are available. Alcohol and tobacco are prohibited. Euthanasia eliminates the incurably insane, persistent criminals, and malformed or illegitimate children. Suicide is expected of the very feeble. Adultery in women is punished by a lifetime of manual work, in men by stripping of property followed by deportation. All children are "considered the property of the state"; having more than four children brings punishment. The state controls and profits from all imports and exports (notably Irish linen and lace). The shores are closely watched to prevent smuggling. Immigration is strictly controlled to exclude loafers. All citizens receive basic military training and form a militia that has proved sufficient to repel invasions. Electro-hydraulic cars run by the government provide quiet and emissionless transportation everywhere on the island. There is a graceful and comfortable but compulsory national dress. Everything is run on scientific principles. "No sooner is anything condemned by the Mother [i.e. government], than its importation or manufacture is strictly forbidden." Poverty, squalor, and sickness are all virtually unknown; purity, peace, health, harmony, and comfort reign. The Amazonians adhere to a state religion that acknowledges a "Giver of Life" to whom thanks is owed. Their conception is that embodied life speeds progress towards wisdom, purity, and bliss; progress continues after bodily death, but more slowly. They maintain their physical perfection by "nerve-rejuvenation," in which the life energy of dogs is transferred to humans. The result is that the Amazonians grow to be seven feet tall, and live for hundreds of years but look no older than forty. They are all "perfect models of beauty, grace and dignity." The narrator tries nerve-regeneration herself: "The sensation I experienced was little more than a pin-prick in intensity, but...I felt ten years younger and stronger, and was proportionately elated at my good fortune." (The procedure, though, is fatal to the dogs.)

The narrator reacts very positively to what she sees and learns; but her loutish and ignorant male companion reacts precisely oppositely and adjusts badly — to the point where the Amazonians judge him to be insane. The narrator nonetheless tries to protect her male counterpart, and in the process is accidentally transported back to the grimmer realities of Victorian England.

== Matriarchy resistance ==
W. H. Hudson's second novel, A Crystal Age (1887), published two years earlier than Corbett's book, also contains the plot element of a nineteenth-century man who cannot adapt to a matriarchal society of the future.

== The author ==
Newcastle journalist Elizabeth Corbett, published as "Mrs. George Corbett." She had a good education and she and her engineer husband had four children of whom three survived. Some of her fifteen novels — mysteries, adventure stories, and mainstream fiction — have clear feminist themes and elements, despite the traditional values of the age in which she lived and worked.

== See also ==
- Arqtiq
- The Diothas
- Mizora
- The Republic of the Future
- Sultana's Dream
- 2894
- Herland (novel)
