= Mizora =

1880–81 novel by Mary E. Bradley Lane

- Author: Mary E. Bradley Lane
- Original title: Mizora: A Prophecy: A Mss. Found Among the Private Papers of Princess Vera Zarovitch: Being a True and Faithful Account of her Journey to the Interior of the Earth, with a Careful Description of the Country and its Inhabitants, their Customs, Manners, and Government
- Language: English
- Genre: Feminine Interest; Science fiction
- Published: 1880 (Cincinnati)

Mizora is a feminist science fiction utopian novel by Mary E. Bradley Lane, first published in 1880–81, when it was serialized in the Cincinnati Commercial newspaper. It appeared in book form in 1890. Mizora is "the first portrait of an all-female, self-sufficient society," and "the first feminist technological Utopia."

The book's full title is Mizora: A Prophecy: A Mss. Found Among the Private Papers of Princess Vera Zarovitch: Being a True and Faithful Account of her Journey to the Interior of the Earth, with a Careful Description of the Country and its Inhabitants, their Customs, Manners, and Government.

== Publication history and influences ==
Mizora was part of the wave of utopian and dystopian fiction that was published in the later decades of the nineteenth century. The novel is "the second known feminist utopian novel written by a woman," after Man's Rights (1870) by Annie Denton Cridge.

The concept of an all-female society dates back at least to the Amazons of ancient Greek mythology — though the Amazons still needed men for procreation. In Lane's Mizora, reproduction is by parthenogenesis.

Mizora also belongs to the class of hollow Earth literature.

The second edition of Mizora appeared in 1975, and it was re-released in 1999 by the University of Nebraska Press. Little is known of the author; Mrs. Lane did not want her husband to find out she was writing about the world being better off without men.

== Plot synopsis ==
The book depicts an all-female "utopia" existing within the Earth. The Mizorans practice eugenics; all of them are blonde "Aryans," who disdain people of darker skin. Their society is composed of blonde women and daughters.

In its ancient history, the land was ruled by a military general elected president (a version of Ulysses Grant). When the general ran for a third term (as Grant was urged to do in 1880), the society of Mizora descended into chaos. Eventually a new all-female social order arose in Mizora. The last men were "eliminated" — though it is not clear whether they were overtly killed or left to die out. It is said that men are more forgotten than hated.

The first-person narrator, Vera Zarovitch, is a young political fugitive who has fallen foul of the Czarist regime and been sentenced to exile in Siberia. She escapes northward into the Arctic, where her kayak is swept over a vast waterfall to Mizora. She spends fifteen years there, learning the ways of the culture; at the end of that time she longs to return to her husband and child, and teach her own society what she has learned. Although Vera ultimately manages to return to her own society, her husband and son are dead, and a Mizoran friend also dies. Vera is left only with the hope that future generations will be better off, "through the promises of universal education and the deeply questionable practice of eugenics".

As a utopian novel, the book devotes some time to the futuristic technology such as "videophones." The Mizorans can make rain by discharging electricity into the air. Though Mizora has no domestic animals, its women eat chemically prepared artificial meat — an innovation that is only under development in the early twenty-first century.

== Social commentary and legacies ==
The novel makes frequent commentary on gender and race. Lane plays with the customs and conventions of her own society, as utopian writers normally do. In Mizora, a narrow waist is considered a "disgusting deformity" — reversing the preference of Lane's own time for tightly-corseted women.

It also refers to political repression in contemporary Russia, and the suppression of the Polish revolt of 1863.

Lane's book anticipates some of the features of Charlotte Perkins Gilman's famous Herland by three decades. It was closely followed by other feminist utopian works, Mrs. George Corbett's New Amazonia: A Foretaste of the Future (1889), and Unveiling a Parallel (1893) by collaborators Alice Ilgenfritz Jones and Ella Merchant. Simultaneously, some male utopian writers published works that involve feminist issues and questions of gender roles; Charles Bellamy's An Experiment in Marriage (1889) and Linn Boyd Porter's Speaking of Ellen (1890) are examples.

== See also ==
- Arqtiq
- The Diothas
- The Republic of the Future
- 2894
