= Earth Revisited =

1893 book by Byron Alden Brooks

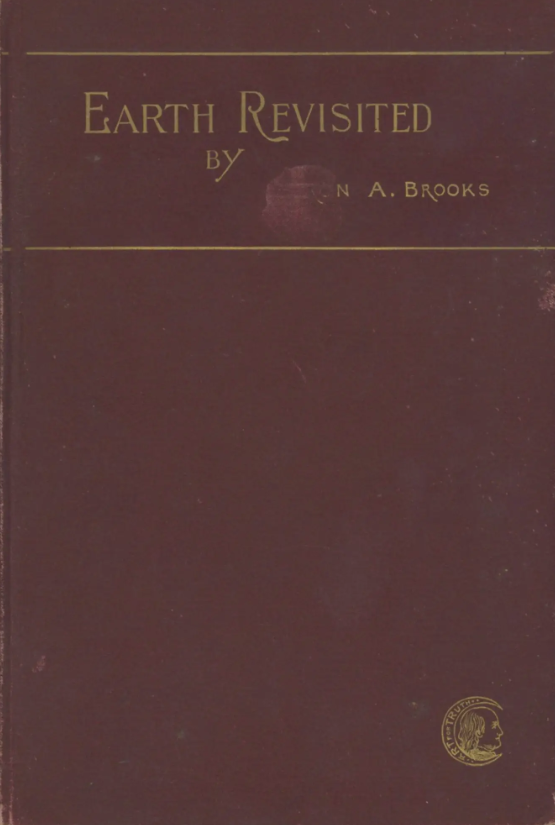
- Author: Byron A. Brooks
- Language: English
- Genre: Speculative fiction Utopian fiction Science fiction
- Publisher: Arena Publishing Co.
- Publication date: 1893
- Publication place: United States
- Media type: Print (Hardcover)
- Pages: 318

Earth Revisited is an 1893 utopian novel by Byron Alden Brooks. It is one entrant in the large body of utopian and speculative fiction that characterized the later 19th and early 20th centuries.

== Genre ==
Brooks sends his protagonist from the late 19th century into the future to experience a vastly improved world. His novel is one of a stream of such books that appeared in the late 19th century. Edward Bellamy's Looking Backward (1888) was the most famous, popular, and influential of these; and Earth Revisited has been dismissively called "One of the stepchildren" of Bellamy's book. Yet Brooks's novel can be usefully compared to an earlier work in the genre, John Macnie's The Diothas (1883). Both books share some particular ideas (like communal food preparation for private homes); and the concept of reincarnation is fundamental to both, which is not typical of the utopian literature of the era as a whole.

Like many other utopian novels, Earth Revisited also verges on science fiction in its anticipation of future technologies. Notably, Brooks envisions contact with intelligent life on the planet Mars: topographic features are engineered as signals between the planets. (On the Earth, a large equilateral triangle, a hundred miles per side, is constructed in the Great Plains.) Brooks also foresees a vast land reclamation project that turns the Sahara Desert into a region of lakes and farmland.

== Society and technology ==
Brooks anticipates a number of developments that would come about in the decades after his book, including a juvenile justice system that is empowered to remove children from homes with unsuitable parents. Technologically, he equips his future with electric cars and dirigible-like aircraft called "anemons." He envisions electricity generated with solar power. (Solar power was in its beginnings in his epoch) He predicts color photography and advances in electronic communications. In what may be the most surprising feature in the book, dogs are taught to understand human speech and respond with a simple code of staccato barks — a foreshadowing of modern communication with apes and other animals using methods like sign language.

== Spiritualism ==
In his novel, author Brooks goes farther than most utopian writers of his generation (including Macnie) ever did in uniting the utopian genre with elements of the spiritualism that was popular in his era. One contemporaneous source classified his book as a "spiritual romance." Brooks uses several elements of spiritualism in his book, including hypnotism, somnambulism, clairvoyance, mediumship, and automatic writing; reincarnation and life after death are important themes. Brooks concludes his book with a long discussion of religious and theological matters.

Every novelist who wants to send their protagonist into the future has to decide on a means of doing so. For Bellamy, hypnosis does the trick, while the anonymous author of The Great Romance administers a "sleeping draught" to his character. Brooks chose the unusual and radical approach of having his hero die, then reawaken in the body of another man living a century later.

== Synopsis ==
The novel delivers the story of Herbert Atheron in a first-person narrative. In 1892 he is a successful businessman, married, the father of a son and daughter. Though not yet 50 years old, he has contracted a fatal illness; at the start of the book, he is dying. He re-evaluates his life, to reach a grim conclusion: he feels that he has wasted his life by concentrating on business and neglecting the personal and familial matters that count most. He especially regrets the loss of his first love, a woman named Theresa, who died young after he abandoned her. On his deathbed, he feels himself "alone in the vast vacuity of space, a naked, shivering soul. A deep darkness of horror engulfed me. I could endure no more."

When he regains consciousness, he finds himself in the body of a 27-year-old man named Harold Amesbury. He discovers that it is now a hundred years later; Amesbury has been ill and delirious for three months. His fiancée, Helen Newcome, is overjoyed at his recovery — but stunned when he reveals his identity as Atherton. Helen determines to nurse Herbert/Harold back to mental health. She leads him out into the world, where he confronts the vast changes of the intervening century, and beholds the "bewildering magnificence and beauty" — of Brooklyn in 1992.

Helen Newcome brings the protagonist to her inventor father; together, the two Newcomes guide the confused time traveller in the realities of 1992. Society has enjoyed vast improvement in the intervening century: the city of Columbia, formerly New York, is cleaner, better organized, more peaceful, healthier, and generally better than before. Electrification and mechanization have brought widespread prosperity, and the extremes of wealth and poverty have been levelled. Government has assumed more responsibility: all land is owned by the state, and people lease the sites of their palatial houses. Newcome the inventor concentrates on improving food production; he receives a stipend from the state, and his inventions go to benefit society as a whole.

Brooks does not dwell on the larger political organization of society, though he indicates the world is dominated by the United States of America and a "United States of Europe." War is a thing of the past.

Brooks blends the technical and the spiritual: when Newcome shows the protagonist the new "harmonic telegraph," Atherton/Amesbury speculates about the possibilities of both radio and telepathy. The second half of the book is dominated by spiritual matters. The protagonist has a rough adjustment to his strange situation, and obsesses over his lost Theresa. Helen Newcome grows distressed at her limited ability to help her fiancé, and leaves for a trip abroad. Atherton/Amesbury boards with a widow and her children. The daughter of the house, Irene, was used as an experimental subject in hypnotism by her late physician father; she is a spontaneous medium and clairvoyant. Irene leads the protagonist on an aerial journey to the now-lush Sahara, where he is re-united with Helen. Through psychic visions, the two come to understand that Helen is the lost Theresa reincarnated. They are happily married in the end.

== The author ==
Byron Alden Brooks (1845–1911) was a native New Yorker, born in the small town of Theresa (a name that he employs for important characters in Earth Revisited). He was educated at Wesleyan University, graduating in 1871. Brooks was a teacher, journalist, and inventor as well as the author of several other literary works. His first book was King Saul (1876). As an inventor, he produced improvements in typewriters and linotype machines; his most notable innovation was probably the first typewriter that could shift between upper- and lower-case letters. He held approximately thirty patents (in printing, telegraph and type-forming machines) and published several novels, among other works.
