= Arena Publishing Co. =

American publishing firm

Benjamin Orange Flower (1858-1918), founder of the Arena Publishing Co. and long-time editor of the company's flagship magazine, The Arena.

Arena Publishing Company was an American book and magazine publishing firm of the late 19th century, founded by author and editor B. O. Flower.

== Company history ==
Cover of The Arena, the monthly flagship publication of the Arena Publishing Co.

Headquartered in Copley Square in Boston, Arena Publishing specialized in fiction and non-fiction books on the progressive causes of the 1890s. Though in existence for only a short period, from 1890 to 1896, Arena issued books by several important figures of the Progressive Era, and was famous for its outspoken editorial stance and willingness to publish controversial works.

Arena released books on political and economic reform and progressive religious movements, including books written by Flower himself. The company's promotional materials advertised "important books for thoughtful people" on "progressive modern thought and effort." It issued a number of the utopian novels that were a prominent feature of American literature in the late 19th century, along with related speculative and science fiction. According to one historian, the firm "published twenty or more fantastic fiction volumes between 1892 and 1896."

Noteworthy Arena writers and books include:

- Hamlin Garland, Main-Travelled Roads (1891)
- Hamlin Garland, A Spoil of Office (1892)
- Hamlin Garland, Jason Edward (1892)
- Byron Brooks, Earth Revisited (1892)
- Alice Ilgenfritz Jones and Ella Merchant, Unveiling a Parallel (1893)
- Elbert Hubbard, One Day: A Tale of the Prairies (1893)
- Elbert Hubbard, Forbes of Harvard (1894)
- Solomon Schindler, Young West (1894)
- Castello Holford, Aristopia (1895)
- Gustavus W. Pope, Journey to Venus (1895)
- John McCoy, A Prophetic Romance (1896)
- William D. McCrackan, The Rise of the Swiss Republic (1892)

The firm's radicalism reached even into the format of its books. Flower believed that the standard printing format of black ink on white paper caused eyestrain; Schindler's Young West, a sequel to Edward Bellamy's famous Looking Backward, was issued with colored borders, that varied among blue, green, and yellow page margins.

Arena also produced popular fiction that concerned socially progressive issues. The titles and authors are now largely forgotten; Helen H. Gardener's feminist novel Pray You, Sir, Whose Daughter? (1892) and M. L. Cowles's Redpath: Life on a Southern Plantation (1893) are not unrepresentative. Flower nourished an interest in spiritualism — he served on the board of directors of the American Psychical Society — and published spiritual novels like Mary Clay Knapp's Whose Soul Have I Now? (1896).

Along with its books, the firm also published a monthly journal titled The Arena, edited by Flower, which called itself "the leading progressive review of the world." The journal featured articles and essays by the company's authors, like Garland and Schindler, plus early work by Frank Norris, Stephen Crane, and Upton Sinclair. It reached a circulation of 30,000 copies. When the company folded in 1896 due to debts and lawsuits, the journal continued to publish under other management.
