= Altruria, California =

Utopian commune in California

Coordinates: 38.506662°N 122.733942°W

Altruria was a short-lived utopian commune in Sonoma County, California, based on Christian socialist principles and inspired by William Dean Howells's 1894 novel, A Traveler from Altruria.

== History ==
Founded by the Unitarian minister Edward B. Payne (1847–1923) and thirty of his followers near Santa Rosa, California, in October 1894, Altruria prospered only for a few months. Payne was born in Vermont, the son of a Congregational minister, and became a minister himself, serving as the pastor of the First Congregational Church of Berkeley in 1875-1880. He then became a Unitarian and served as minister for Unitarian churches in New Hampshire, Massachusetts, and several other east coast locations. In 1892 he returned to Berkeley as the first minister of First Unitarian Church, where he delivered sermons reflecting socialist principles and covering political events of his era. The last installment of William Dean Howells' popular work, A Traveller from Altruria, was published in the 1893 issue of Cosmopolitan. Several Altrurian groups subsequently emerged in the Bay Area, and at one of these gatherings in 1894, a Berkeley-based Altrurian Club decided to change its focus from discussing social change to implementing social change through the establishment of a colony; Payne was a charter member. Several such societies were created in the San Francisco and Los Angeles areas.

The Altrurian, the group's Berkeley-based newspaper, was first published in October 1894. The Altrurian sought to promote the community's ideals and the formation of Altrurian societies. As reported by the Altrurian in fall of 1894, the Altrurians had secured property with several small houses and a grist mill in the hills near Santa Rosa. The first colonists arrived in October 1894. After settlement, the community started a hotel on the property. Poor management and funding challenges posed by the hotel project caused the group to implement a reorganization plan to avoid bankruptcy only one year after the group was founded. At the same time, the group founded two new locations. The financial problems however proved insurmountable; all the locations were abandoned in 1896.

The Altrurians kept orchards and gardens and sold their produce in a shop in San Francisco, whose manager was Job Harriman.

== See also ==
- Altruism
- Llano del Rio, founded in 1914 by Job Harriman
- New religious movement
