= Mary Bradley =

Mary Bradley may refer to:

- Mary Bradley (politician) (1942–2025), member of the Northern Ireland Assembly
- Mary Hastings Bradley (1882–1976), traveler and author
- Mary Forrest Bradley (1869–1965), American historian and socialite
- Mary Jones Bradley (1920–2010), American heiress, racehorse owner and breeder

== See also ==
- Mary E. Bradley Lane (1844–1930), American feminist science fiction teacher and author
