= Arqtiq =

1899 novel by Anna Adolph

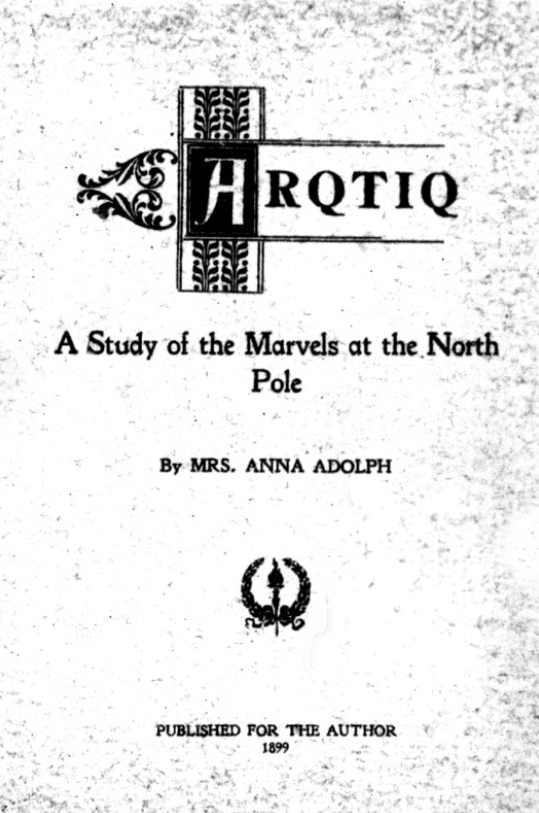
- Title page for Arqtiq: A Study of the Marvels at the North Pole (1899)
- Author: Anna Adolph
- Language: English
- Genre: Adventure fiction Fantasy; Speculative fiction Utopian fiction
- Publisher: Privately printed
- Publication date: 1899
- Publication place: United States
- Media type: Print (Hardcover)
- Pages: 80

Arqtiq: A Study of the Marvels at the North Pole is a feminist utopian adventure novel, published in 1899 by its author, Anna Adolph. The book was one element in the major wave of utopian and dystopian fiction that marked the later nineteenth and early twentieth centuries.

== Genre ==
Arqtiq participates in, bridges, and hybridizes several related literary genres and subgenres of its time. Some writers applied feminist viewpoints to utopian fiction; Elizabeth Corbett's New Amazonia is one pertinent example, among others. A number of late-nineteenth-century novels looked forward to the invention of the airplane, as Adolph's book does; these works can be classed, at least generally or peripherally, as science fiction. Arqtiq combines this "airplane fiction" with utopian feminism, as does Jones and Merchant's Unveiling a Parallel.

Arqtiq also partakes in the exotic subgenres of hollow Earth or subterranean fiction, and lost-world or lost-race fiction. Like Mary Lane's Mizora, Adolph's Arqtiq gives these forms of adventure fiction a feminist twist.

Stories of travel to the North Pole or South Pole recurred throughout the nineteenth century. Edgar Allan Poe's The Narrative of Arthur Gordon Pym of Nantucket is the most famous of these; there were various others.

Finally, Adolph couches her story as a dream, linking it to a whole host of fantasies that employ the dreaming motif.

== Story ==
The plot of Arqtiq involves a woman who invents an aircraft, a sort of hybrid of airplane and balloon. She decides to fly it to the North Pole, accompanied by her husband, father, and friends (characters based on the author's own relationships). After crossing the continent to New York, they travel northwards and reach the Pole. At first they perceive only a flat plain surrounded with icebergs; but the narrator detects a crystal city beneath the ice. The aeronauts land and meet the inhabitants, called the Arq. The Arq maintain a culture of gender equality and high technology. Communication is facilitated by the Arqs' telepathy; the narrator soon develops the same psychic ability. Despite their isolation, the Arq are devout Christians.

Adolph's Arqtiq has been characterized as "An eccentric novel combining elements of science fiction and religious fundamentalism," and an "exuberantly incoherent" book that also touches upon the work of John Symmes, a lunar meteorite, and "lunar people who are tiny and nasty".

== See also ==
- The Great Romance
- The Milltillionaire
- Sub-Coelum
