= A Prophetic Romance =

1896 novel by John McCoy

A Prophetic Romance: Mars to Earth
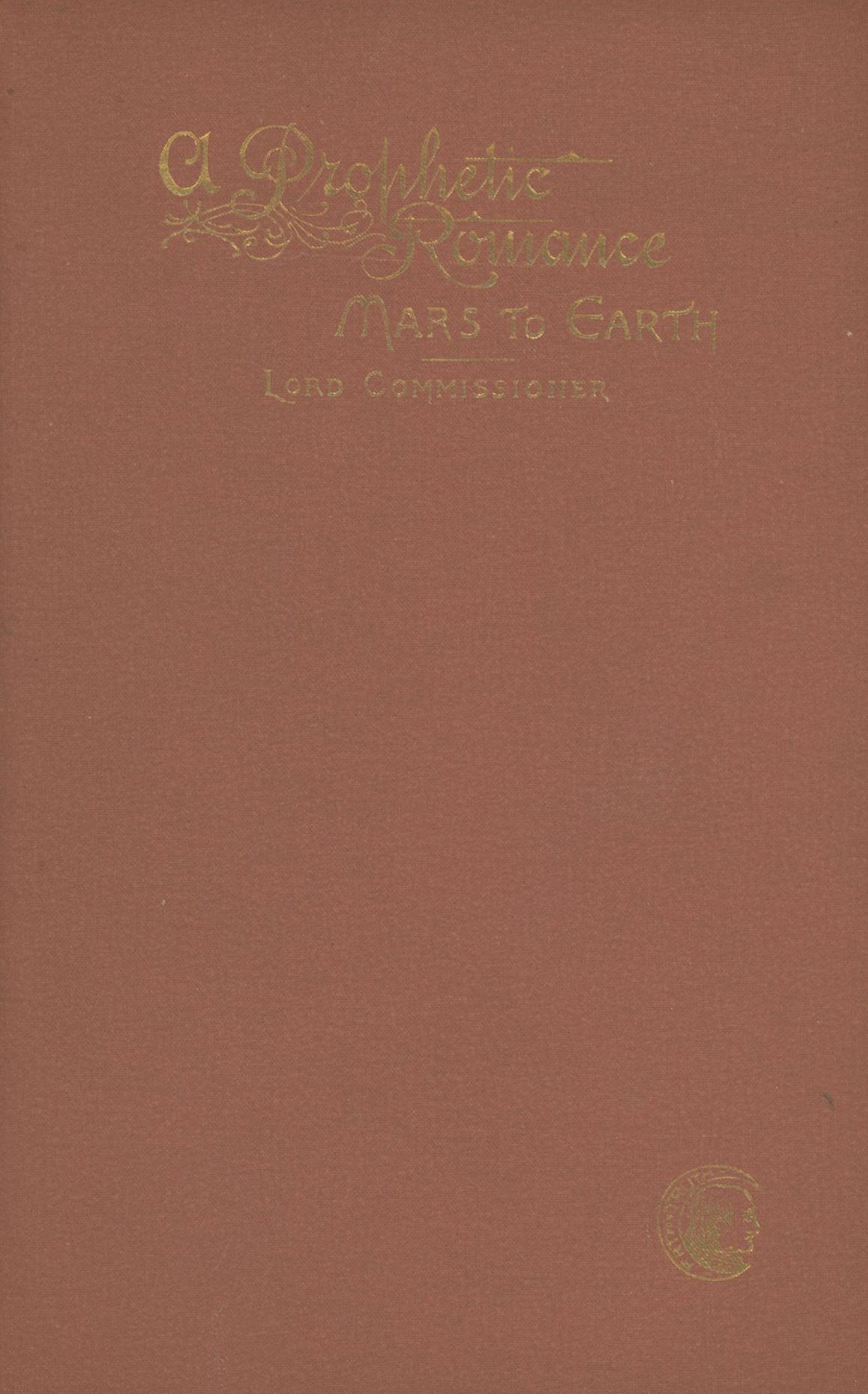
- Book cover for A Prophetic Romance: Mars to Earth (1896)
- Author: John McCoy (as "The Lord Commissioner")
- Language: English
- Genre: Utopian fiction Speculative fiction Science fiction
- Publisher: Arena Publishing Co.
- Publication date: 1896
- Publication place: United States
- Media type: Print (Hardcover)
- Pages: 283 pp.

A Prophetic Romance: Mars to Earth is an 1896 utopian novel written by John McCoy and published pseudonymously as the work of "The Lord Commissioner," the narrator of the tale. The book is one element in the major wave of utopian and dystopian literature that characterized the final decades of the nineteenth century.

The story is written in a form resembling an epistolary novel: it consists of a series of reports from a Martian government official, the Lord Commissioner. He has been sent to Earth by the "Chancellor Commander" of Mars, the head of that planet's unified government, to report on terrestrial conditions (the Martians are more advanced than humans, and have explored the Solar System). The time of the story is not specified, though details in the text suggest the late twentieth century, about a hundred years after the book's publication.

The Lord Commissioner travels to Earth by spaceship; he endures hallucinations due to the interplanetary "atmosphere." He lands at "Midland," the capital of the United States, and meets the president, who happens to be a woman. American society has been reformulated after a revolution around the turn of the twentieth century, when irate citizens blew up the Capitol and its congressmen. Laws must be approved by popular referendums before they take effect. The United States has expanded to include Canada and Central America. The salaries of business executives are limited. Gender equality has been achieved.

Technology has made major advances, including aircraft and electric cars; there is even a "lovemeter" that detects emotions. Vegetarianism is dominant, and alcohol abuse is a thing of the past. The Bible has been edited, with the bloody parts removed. Divorces are uncommon, and hard to obtain.

The Lord Commissioner falls in love with an Earth woman named Loleta, a friend of the president; he decides to remain on Earth with her.
