= The World a Department Store =

1900 novel by Bradford C. Peck

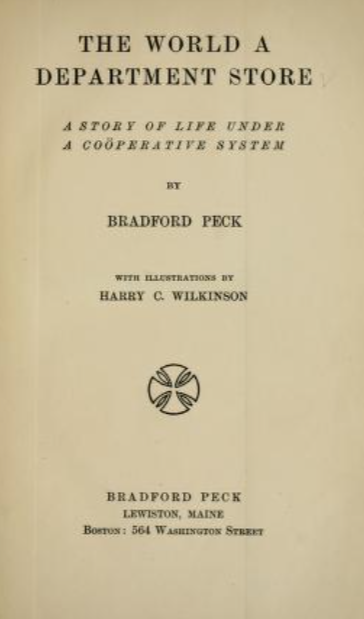
- Title page for The World a Department Store: A Story of Life Under a Coöperative System (1900)
- Author: Bradford C. Peck
- Illustrator: Harry C. Wilkinson
- Language: English
- Genre: Utopian fiction
- Publisher: Privately printed
- Publication date: 1900
- Publication place: United States
- Media type: Print (Hardcover)
- Pages: 312 pp.

The World a Department Store: A Story of Life Under a Coöperative System is a utopian novel written by Bradford C. Peck, and published by him in 1900. The book was one entrant in the wave of utopian and dystopian writing that occurred in the late nineteenth and early twentieth centuries. Moreover, Peck's book was one of the minority of utopian works of the time that was linked to an effort at practical application of its ideas.

== The Cooperative ==
Bradford Peck (1853–1935) has been compared to King Gillette as a successful businessman of the Gilded Age who nonetheless advocated views that were, to some degree, anti-capitalist and pro-socialist. Peck followed the Horatio Alger pattern in American life, rising from poverty to commercial success; a native of Lewiston, Maine, he built the largest department store in the state in its time. In reaction to the chaotic business conditions of the Panic of 1893, Peck began to develop a commitment to the emerging cooperative movement.

Peck formed a local co-operative association in 1899 and soon promoted it into the "Coöperative Association of America." His goal was to link producers with consumers as directly as possible, eliminating all expenses of "middle-men", bankers and interest payments, and advertising costs, and so creating a far more efficient and economical business model than the one dominant in America in his generation. The Association established a co-op grocery and restaurant and opened a reading room; Peck later transferred the ownership of his department store to the Association so that its profits would support the cause.

Peck organized conventions and other activities to promote the co-operative movement. The Association tried to form a co-operative community in Oregon in 1906, but without success. The Lewiston co-op shut down in 1912, when the C.A.A. lost its lease on its headquarters. Peck, however, remained a vigorous advocate of his views until his death at age 82. He also wrote The World a Department Store, his only novel, to promote his vision. The book sold for $1.00 per copy; royalties went to the Association. (A British edition was issued by the publisher Gay & Bird, also in 1900.)

== Influences ==
By his own admission, Peck was an admirer of Edward Bellamy and his famous novel Looking Backward (1888); he was also influenced by Henry George's Progress and Poverty (1879) and Charles Sheldon's In His Steps (1896). When Peck published his novel, it "caught the imagination of some socialists in the same way as Bellamy's works had."

== The book ==
The plot of the novel begins on April 7, 1925. The opening chapters introduce two young men, George Wilkinson and Harry Childs, and their girlfriends, Mabel Clay and Alice Furbush. The young men are roommates, as are the young women; they all work for various functions of Coöperative City. They are struck and fascinated by the story of Percy Brantford, which they read in that morning's newspaper.

Brantford had been a successful businessman of the late nineteenth century — though like many men of that type he suffered from the intense stresses, anxieties, and uncertainties of the commercial world. He used a sleeping potion to combat his insomnia. On the night of December 31, 1899 (in popular reckoning, the last day of the century), Brantford took a double dose of his sleeping powder; he lapsed into a coma and slept for 25 years. The young people read the news story that recounts Brantford's sudden awakening in a local nursing home.

The committee that runs the City appoints Childs and Wilkinson to be Brantford's guides in his adjustment to the new social and economic reality. Brantford is amazed to learn that the co-operative movement has transformed the Lewiston he knew into Coöperative City, which is run on a vastly different and improved system. Most of the book is devoted to explanations of the workings of the Coöperative Association of America, and how it has come to dominate the former Lewiston and spread to New York City, Chicago, and other major cities. Wilkinson and Childs detail all major aspects of the new system, to Brantford's wondering admiration. The new system has eliminated poverty, tenements, slums, litter, and other evil aspects of the old economy.

Some of the details of Peck's plan are effective forecasts of later developments. The members of the C.A.A. use "coupon checks" instead of the "old-style microbe-breeding currency." Photo IDs are used. Both men and women pursue physical fitness, and work out in gymnasiums. The public school system monitors the schoolchildren's nutritional needs.

Brantford, for his part, reminisces about the bad old days of Gilded-Age capitalism; he recalls a system so irrational and rapacious that every man in business necessarily had a "dishonest career...." He recalls brokers on the stock exchanges as "a lot of maniacs, running wild...," and makes similar remarks on the conditions of the earlier age.

The plot retains at least a vestigial human-interest storyline. The young people have a neighbor named Helen Brown; she and Percy Brantford develop a romance, and in the end the three couples join in a triple wedding.

Throughout his book, Peck stresses that the new economic and social system has moral and ethical and even religious implications. The regime of Coöperative City and the C.A.A. empowers a "true cooperative Christian existence" instead of frustrating people's normal drives to neighborliness and virtue. Through co-operation, humanity has formed itself "into a practical Christian organization...." The book begins with a Preface and Prospectus written by a clergyman; Peck closes his novel with a chapter on the religious, ethical, and social implications of his plan.

As a result, Peck's novel has been termed a Social Gospel book.

== Style ==
Peck was not an experienced writer, and made no pretensions to literary quality in his work; his book has been criticized for its "inept and pretentious style." He wrote in the manner of popular magazines, travelogues, and advertising copy; Coöperative City is "the most beautiful city in all the world," and its buildings and features are described as "delightful," "elegant," "heavenly," and "magnificent." As Brantford progresses through his tour of the city, his comments are along the lines of "Wonderful, wonderful! and what marvelous changes from my former life!" In describing a private home, Peck writes, "Our readers, no doubt, will feel interested to know something of the character and style of this beautiful home....Here was to be found every convenience and luxury known to those living in the last century."

Beyond the verbal expression, Peck's aesthetic is shaped by his professional experience: his future is clean and polished, well-organized and brightly displayed. His world is very much like a department store.

== The illustrations ==
Peck's book was furnished with multiple illustrations by Harry C. Wilkinson. This sets it apart from most Utopian works of the era, though King Gillette's The Human Drift (1894) was similarly well-illustrated. Wilkinson's pictures show outside views and floor plans of the buildings lavishly described by Peck, as well as street plans of the city's neighborhoods, and a "coupon check" book.
