= List of sequels to Looking Backward =

Looking Backward is a utopian novel by Edward Bellamy, a lawyer and writer from western Massachusetts. First published in 1888 (Ticknor and Company Copyrighted the work in 1887), it describes a young man, named Julian West, who falls asleep in 1887 and wakes up in 2000 to find the United States has become a socialist utopia. In the first years of its release, Looking Backward sold more than 1 million copies. More than 160 Nationalist Clubs formed to propagate the book's ideas. Many authors wrote utopian fiction to attack, support, ridicule, or defend Bellamy's ideas. Scholars count over 150 sequels or other fictional responses to Bellamy's book. This list focuses on works that (to various extents) use the same setting or characters as Looking Backward, and were derived from several sources.

== Directly 'anti-Bellamy' responses ==
- Bachelder, J., A.D. 2050. Electrical Development at Atlantis (1890)
- Sutton E. Griggs, Imperium in Imperio (1899)
- Harris, G. Inequality and Progress (1897) [which assumes Bellamy advocated an absolute equality of goods]
- Michaelis, R.C., Looking Further Forward: An Answer to "Looking Backward" by Edward Bellamy (1890)
- Roberts, J.W., Looking Within: The Misleading Tendencies of "Looking Backward" Made Manifest (1893)
- Sanders, G.A., Reality: or Law and order vs. Anarchy and Socialism, A Reply to Edward Bellamy’s Looking Backward and Equality (1898)
- Satterlee, W.W., Looking Backward and What I Saw (1890)
- Vinton, A.D., Looking Further Backward (1890)
- West, J. [pseud.], My Afterdream (1900)
- Wilbrant, C., Mr. East's Experiences in Mr. Bellamy's World (1891)
- Mantegazza, Paolo, The Year 3000. A Dream (L'anno 3000. Sogno) (1897)

== Direct and positive utopian responses / unofficial sequels ==
- Berwick, E., 'Farming in the Year 2000, A.D.', Overland Monthly (1890)
- Bellamy, C.J., An Experiment in Marriage. A Romance (1889) [Bellamy's brother]
- Chavannes, A., In Brighter Climes, or Life in Socioland (1895) by A. Chavannes
- Chavannes, A., The Future Commonwealth (1892)
- Claflin, S.F., Nationalism. Or a System of Organic Unity (189x)
- 'Crusoe, R.', Looking Upwards; or Nothing New (1892)
- Emmens, S.H., The Sixteenth Amendment (1896)
- Flower, B.O., Equality and Brotherhood (1897) [A positive response to Bellamy's Equality, see also 'The Latest Social Vision', Arena v.18, pp. 517–34]
- Flower, B.O., The New Time (1894)
- Fuller, A.M., A.D. 2000 (1890)
- Geissler, L.A., Looking Beyond (1891)
- Giles, F.S., The Industrial Army (1896)
- Griffin, C.S., Nationalism (1889)
- Gronlund, L., Our Destiny. The Influence of Nationalism on Morals and Religion (1890) [first syndicated The Nationalist, (March–September 1890)]
- Hayes, F.W., The Great Revolution of 1905: Or, The story of the Phalanx (1893)
- Hertzka, T., Freeland, a Social Anticipation (1890)
- Howard, E., To-Morrow: A Peaceful Path to Real Reform (1898)
- Hillman, H.W., Looking Forward (1906)
- McCowan, A., Philip Meyer’s Scheme (1892)
- Moffat, W., White, G., and White J., What’s the World Coming To? (1893)
- Porter, L.B., Speaking of Ellen (1890) [not a utopia]
- Salisbury, H.B., 'The Birth of Freedom', The Nationalist (November 1890, Mar–Apr 1891)
- Schindler, S., 'Dr. Leete's Letter to Julian West', The Nationalist (September 1890)
- Schindler, S., Young West: A Sequel to Edward Bellamy's Celebrated Novel "Looking Backward" (1894)
- Stone, C.H., One of Berrian’s Novels (1890)
- Unitas, D.J., Looking Backward from the Tricentennial (2024)
- Worley, F.U., Three Thousand Dollars a Year (1890) [a gradualist utopia]
- Yovchev, I.S., The Present as Seen by Our Descendants And a Glimpse at the Progress of the Future ("Настоящето, разгледано от потомството ни и надничане в напредъка на бъдещето", 1900).

== Equality ==
- Equality (1897), by Edward Bellamy. Bellamy's sequel to his earlier book deals with women's rights, education and many other issues. Bellamy wrote the sequel to elaborate and clarify many of the ideas merely touched upon in Looking Backward. Less successful than Looking Backward, Equality continues the story of Julian West as he adjusts to life in the future. A short story "The Parable of the Water-Tank" from the book was popular with a number of early American socialists.

== A. D. 2050 ==
- A. D. 2050: Electrical Development at Atlantis (San Francisco: Bancroft, 1890). Author credited as "A Former Resident of the Hub" (believed to be John Bachelder). In A. D. 2050, people tired of living under Nationalism flee to a previously undiscovered continent, call it Atlantis, and create a form of modified capitalism. They repel several invasions from China.

== A Leap into the Future ==
- A Leap into the Future, or How Things Will Be: A Romance of the Year 2000 (Albany, New York: Weed, Parsons, & Co. 1890) by Donald McMartin. Continues where Looking Backward left off, with Julian West still adjusting to the future and visiting various institutions of the year 2000. West also gains the power to visit the nineteenth century in his dreams, and several chapters deal with his experiences comparing the past with the future.

== Looking Backward and What I Saw ==
- Looking Backward And What I Saw (Minneapolis: Harrison and Smith, c. 1890), by W.W. Satterlee. The narrator of this work falls asleep and dreams he visits a future USA that has embraced Bellamy's ideology. However, since everyone is guaranteed an income regardless of how much work they do, the vast majority of the population have become tramps and vagabonds. This book also borrows heavily from Pilgrim's Progress, as the narrator has several visionary dreams within the main dream, including one where he visits Vanity Fair.

== Looking Further Forward ==
- Looking Further Forward (Rand, McNaly and Co.: Chicago, 1890), by Richard C. Michaelis. Julian West discovers that utopia is on the verge of collapse. A series of dialogues with a janitor (who used to be a professor but was fired when he criticized the state) discuss how controlled capitalism is superior to socialism. A bloody massacre erupts when a jilted lover of Edith Leete (West's beloved in Looking Backward) leads a violent revolution.

== Looking Further Backward ==
- Looking Further Backward (Albany: Albany Book Company, 1890), by Arthur Dudley Vinton. China invades Bellamy's utopian America. As the utopian United States has abolished the military, only Julian West understands war and what is at stake — however, no one will listen to him as they are unable to think for themselves because the future system has abolished individuality. The book is presented as a series of lectures given by Won Lung Li (or "One Long Lie"), the Chinese successor to West's post as professor of history.

== One of "Berrian's" Novels ==
- One of "Berrian’s" Novels (New York: Welch, Fracker Company, 1890), by C.H. Stone. In Looking Backward, Berrian was the greatest novelist of the year 2000. This was an attempt to write a "Berrian" novel, to show that fiction could still be interesting, even if set in a conflict free utopia. The plot deals with a last-ditch attempt by a discontented few to overthrow the socialist government. The main heroine, Lys, is torn between two lovers, one a virtuous man and the other one of the malcontents preaching rebellion.

== Looking Beyond ==
- Looking Beyond: A Sequel to "Looking Backward" by Edward Bellamy, and an Answer to "Looking Further Forward" by Richard Michaelis (L. Graham and Son: New Orleans, 1891), by Ludwig A. Geissler. In this tale, the violent revolution presented at the end of Richard Michaelis's book becomes Julian West's nightmare, and so never happened. West learns that the janitor he has been talking to is wrong on all points, and a debate between a supporter and a skeptic of the future society ends with Bellamy's utopia triumphant. Also, Earth establishes communication with Mars.

== Mr. East's Experiences in Mr. Bellamy's World ==
- Mr. East's Experiences in Mr. Bellamy's World (Harper: New York, 1891), by Conrad Wilbrandt and translated by Mary J. Safford (originally written in German). Mr. Ost (Mr. East), a German, reads Looking Backward and decides to try being mesmerised (as Julian West was in Bellamy's book). He awakens in the future society of Looking Backward, only to discover it is full of shoddy goods, poor wages, and sexual favoritism.

== Looking Within ==
- Looking Within: The Misleading Tendencies of "Looking Backward" Made Manifest (A.S. Barnes: New York, 1893) by J. W. Roberts. The narrator (James North) acquires a potion that allows him and his beloved to sleep in suspended animation for several years. They first awaken in 1927 to discover the United States in open class warfare. They sleep again and awaken in 2000 and meet Julian West, Dr. Leete and other denizens of Bellamy's utopia. They discover rampant favoritism and a society on the brink of collapse. Sleeping again, they awaken in 2025 to find that society has returned to capitalism to survive.

== Young West ==
- Young West: A Sequel to Edward Bellamy's Celebrated Novel "Looking Backward" (1894), by Solomon Schindler, describes the adventures of Julian West's son, who (after discovering a way to make sewage useful) becomes president of the future utopia.

== My Afterdream ==
- My Afterdream (London: T. Fisher Unwin, 1900), by "Julian West" (a pseudonym; actual author unknown). This parody takes many of Bellamy's suggestions to hilarious logical extremes to portray Bellamy's ideas as impractical. For example, Bellamy said that work time would vary, based on how enjoyable the job was. Therefore, in this novel, funeral processions require hundreds of people to carry the caskets, as each person can only spend a few minutes working. However, artists must work full 48-hour weeks because their work is enjoyable.

== Looking Forward ==
- Looking Forward: The Phenomenal Progress of Electricity in 1912 (Valley View Publishing: Northampton, Mass., 1906), by Harry W. Hillman. A prequel, this book is dedicated to Bellamy, and describes a revolution in electricity that will help bring about Bellamy's world.

== Looking Backward from the Tricentennial ==
- Looking Backward from the Tricentennial (2024). This retelling of Bellamy's original novel has Dr. Leete reviving Julian West, a formerly incarcerated Black man, in 2076. Julian is given an American Union Job, a form of unconditional basic income, and taught the details of monetary theory, the principles of nonviolence, the workings of the people's legislative assembly which has crowdsourced Congress, and the application of game theory to electoral politics. The novel concludes with Julian West time traveling back to 2023, hoping to implement the new paradigm and prevent a civil war in the United States. The lessons are heavily influenced by the teachings of Martin Luther King.

== Looking Backward from the Year 2000 ==
- Looking Backward from the Year 2000 (1973), by Mack Reynolds. This is a remake or retelling of Bellamy's original novel.

== Equality in the Year 2000 ==
- Equality in the Year 2000 (1977), by Mack Reynolds. A sequel to Looking Backward from the Year 2000.

== Edward Bellamy Writes Again ==
- Edward Bellamy Writes Again (1997), by Joseph R. Myers. This self-published revision of "Looking Backward" is written in a similar style and structure to the original "Looking Backward," but focuses more on spiritual and moral possibilities, rather than political and economic possibilities. The author argues in the book's preface that he is in fact Bellamy's reincarnation and has returned to update the original. The beliefs and teachings in this book are heavily influenced by the teachings and visions of Edgar Cayce.
