= Otto Müller (novelist) =

German novelist (1816–1894)

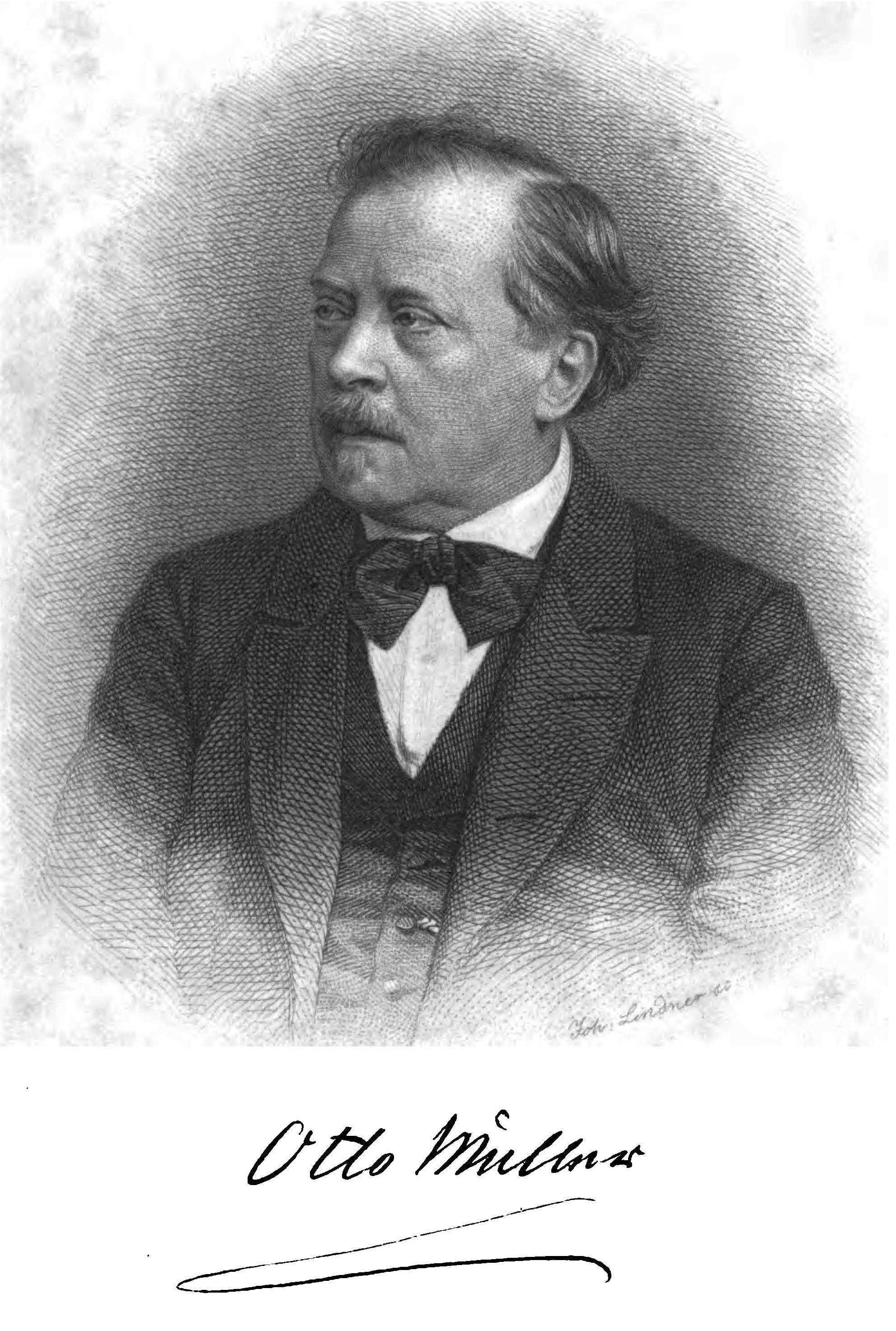
- Born: June 1, 1816; Schotten, Hesse-Darmstadt
- Died: August 6, 1894 (aged 78); Stuttgart, Baden-Württemberg, Germany
- Occupation: Novelist

Otto Müller (June 1, 1816 – August 6, 1894) was a German novelist.

== Biography ==
Müller was born at Schotten, Hesse-Darmstadt. He began his career as a librarian at the court library at Darmstadt and edited newspapers at Frankfurt and Mannheim. In 1854 he established the Frankfurter Museum. In 1856, he settled in Stuttgart, where he died nearly forty years later, aged 78.

== Works ==
His Ausgewählte Schriften (Selected Writings) appeared in Stuttgart in 1874 (12 vols.).

=== Fiction ===
He early published a series of novels. In 1845, appeared Bürger, ein deutsches Dichterleben, a novel. After that, he published Georg Völker. Ein Roman aus dem Jahre 1848 (a novel from the year 1848) and other political novels. Subsequent novels are:

- Charlotte Ackermann (1854)
- Der Stadtschultheiss von Frankfurt (1856; 3d ed. 1878), treating of Goethe's grandparents
- Der Klosterhof (1859)
- Aus Petrarca's alten Tagen (1862)
- Erzählungen und Charakterbilder (1865)
- Der Wildpfarrer (1866)
- Der Professor von Heidelberg (1870)
- Der Fall von Konstanz (1872)
- Der Majoratsherr (1873)
- Schatten auf Höhen (1881)
