= The Great Romance =

1881 English-language utopian novel by anonymous

- Title page for The Great Romance (1881 originally), this edition was published by the University of Nebraska Press in 2008.
- Author: Anonymous ("The Inhabitant")
- Language: English
- Genre: Science fiction Speculative fiction Utopian fiction
- Publisher: Privately printed
- Publication date: 1881
- Publication place: New Zealand
- Media type: Print (Hardcover)
- Pages: Vol. 1, 55; Vol. 2, 39

The Great Romance is a science fiction and Utopian novel, first published in New Zealand in 1881. It had a significant influence on Edward Bellamy's 1888 Looking Backward, the most popular Utopian novel of the late nineteenth century.

== The book ==
The Great Romance is a short novel, originally published in two parts. The texts appeared anonymously: authorship was attributed to The Inhabitant, "a pseudonym common at the time for guidebooks in the United Kingdom and the United States...." The work is one aspect of the major wave of Utopian (and dystopian) literature that characterized the later nineteenth and early twentieth centuries. In the English-speaking world, that literature is best known in its American and British expressions; but The Great Romance illustrates how that wave of utopian fiction reached into the remoter regions of the Anglophone domain. An 1882 article in the Christchurch newspaper The Star identifies the author as "Mr Henry Honor, a gentleman resident in Ashburton". A review of both parts of the book appeared in the Dunedin Otago Daily Times in 1882.

== Literary connections ==
In The Great Romance, the protagonist endures a long sleep and awakes in the future. He meets and falls in love with a young woman named Edith, a descendant of an important figure in his earlier life, who then serves as a guide for the protagonist in the new world he confronts. These elements unite The Great Romance with Bellamy's famous book. A third novel of the period, John Macnie's The Diothas, may have served as a conduit for the common features shared by the Inhabitant's and Bellamy's fictions; all three share these commonalities, and Macnie's book has a New Zealand connection that Bellamy's lacks. Yet it is also possible that Bellamy drew upon The Great Romance directly rather than through any intermediary work: editor Dominic Alessio has argued that Bellamy's later short story "To Whom This May Come" shows a "pervasive" influence of the Inhabitant's work on the shared theme of telepathic communication.

== Synopsis ==
The book's opening scene portrays the protagonist, John Hope, awakening from a sleep of 193 years. Hope had been a prominent mid-twentieth-century scientist, who had developed new power sources that enabled air travel and, eventually, space exploration. In the year 1950, Hope had taken a "sleeping draught" that put him into a long suspended animation, as part of a planned experiment. When he wakes in the year 2143, he is met by Alfred and Edith Weir, descendants of John Malcolm Weir, the chemist who had prepared the sleeping draft Hope had taken in 1950.

Hope is shocked to find that the Weirs and their contemporaries have telepathic abilities. The development of telepathy as a general human talent has led to a vastly improved society. People can no longer conceal malevolent motives and plans, a fact that has inaugurated a new moral order. Those who have been unable or unwilling to adapt to this new social and ethical climate have left civilized society for more primitive lands, where the telepathic power is not dominant.

Hope joins with Alfred Weir and another scientist, Charles Moxton, in a plan to fly a specially-equipped craft to the planet Venus. Moxton has developed his paranormal abilities to include telekinesis. The later chapters of the book describe their flight to Venus, and what they find on that planet.

The Great Romance makes a special effort to attempt a realistic forecast of what space travel would be like, in terms of the absence of breathable atmosphere and gravity in space, and comparable factors. In these aspects, the book reflects the likely influence of Percy Greg's 1880 novel Across the Zodiac.

== New editions ==
The original edition of The Great Romance is one of the rarest books extant, with single copies of Parts 1 and 2 existing in New Zealand libraries. After a century of neglect, the book has been reprinted by editor Dominic Alessio, first in Science Fiction Studies in 1993 (Part 1) and then in a separate volume in 2008 (Parts 1 and 2). (A third part of the story is thought to have existed, but no copy has yet been found.)

The book's rediscovery is one product of the widespread re-evaluation of early science fiction that has brought new editions of rare works like Jules Verne's Paris in the Twentieth Century and The Golden Volcano.

== See also ==
- Arqtiq
- The Milltillionaire
- Journey to Venus
- To Venus in Five Seconds
