= Josef Lauff =

German poet and dramatist (1855–1933)

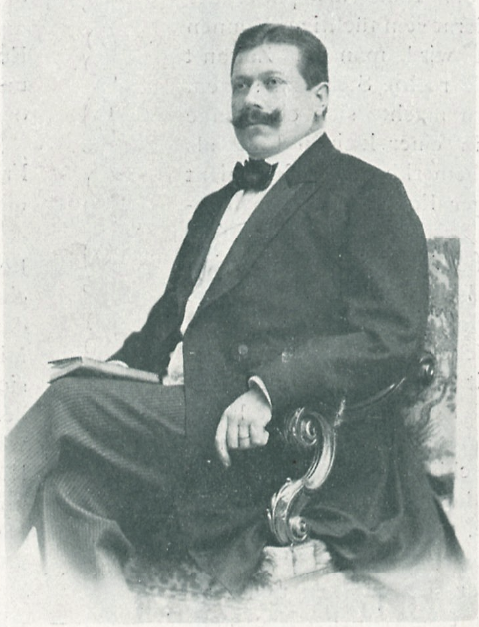
Josef Lauff, c. 1903

Josef Lauff (16 November 1855 – 1933) was a German poet and dramatist.

He was born at Cologne, the son of a jurist. He was educated at Münster in Westphalia, and entering the army served as a lieutenant of artillery at Thorn and subsequently at Cologne, where he attained the rank of captain in 1890. In 1898 he was summoned by the German emperor, William II, to Wiesbaden, being at the same time promoted to major's rank, in order that he might devote his great dramatic talents to the royal theatre.

His literary career began with the epic poems Jan van Calker, ein Malerlied vom Niederrhein (1887, 3rd edition, 1892) and Der Helfensteiner, ein Sang aus dem Bauernkriege (3rd edition, 1896). These were followed by Die Overstolzin (5th edition, 1900), Herodias (2nd edition, 1898) and Die Geißlerin (4th edition, 1902). He also wrote the novels Die Hexe (6th edition, 1900), Regina coeli (a story of the fall of the Dutch Republic) (7th edition, 1904), Die Hauptmannsfrau (8th edition, 1903) and Marie Verwahnen (1903).

But he is best known as a dramatist. Beginning with the tragedy Inez de Castro (1894), he proceeded to dramatize the great monarchs of his country, and, in a Hohenzollern tetralogy, issued Der Burggraf (1897, 6th edition 1900) and Der Eisenzahn (1900), to be followed by Der grosse Kurfurst (The Great Elector) and Friedrich der Große (Frederick the Great).
