= Ludwig Pfau =

German poet, journalist, and revolutionary (1821–1894)

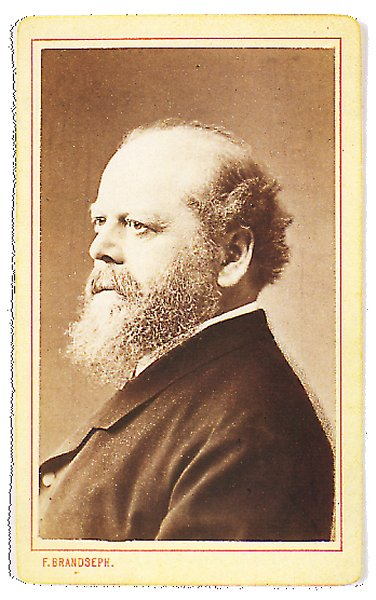
Ludwig Pfau

Karl Ludwig Pfau (German: [ˈluːtviç ˈpfaʊ]; August 25, 1821 – April 12, 1894) was a German poet, journalist, and revolutionary. He was born in Heilbronn and died, aged 72, in Stuttgart.

== Poetry ==
Some of Ludwig Pfau's poetry has been used in the composition of Kunstlieder (or more popularly in English, Lieder). Many German texts, including texts set to music by Schoenberg, have been collected and housed on-line at The LiederNet Archive. Many are available in English translation in this collection.
