= Through the Eye of the Needle =

1907 novel by William Dean Howells

- First edition
- Author: William Dean Howells
- Language: English
- Genre: Utopian fiction Science fiction
- Publisher: Harper & Brothers
- Publication date: 1907
- Publication place: United States
- Media type: Print
- Preceded by: Letters of an Altrurian Traveler

Through the Eye of the Needle: A Romance is a 1907 Utopian novel written by William Dean Howells. It is the final volume in Howells's "Altrurian trilogy," following A Traveler from Altruria (1894) and Letters of an Altrurian Traveler (1904).

Like the second book in the trilogy, Howells casts the third and final book in the form of an epistolary novel — a form favored by some other Utopian and dystopian writers. (For examples, see: The Republic of the Future; Caesar's Column.) In the final book, Aristides Homos, Howells's Altrurian protagonist, writes a series of letters home to his friend Cyril. Homos is now located in the densely urban environment of New York City, where he confronts the contrasts between America c. 1900 and his own pastoral and agrarian Utopianism in their most extreme forms.

The dramatic center of the book is the love affair between Homos and Evelith Strange, a wealthy widow of the American plutocracy. Evelith has chosen the life of a socialite because she is frustrated by the limited effects of "good works" — though her routine of idleness conflicts with her Christian values and her conscience. Evelith must decide whether to abandon her social position and her fortune to follow Homos back to Altruria. Eventually, Evelith marries Homos, and both she and her mother return with him to Altruria. The mother-in-law finds the adjustment relatively easy, since she realizes that she has returned to the simpler life she knew in her youth.

Howells gives the moral writings of Leo Tolstoy an important role in the book — though not with naive acceptance. At one point, Evelith tells Homos that "Tolstoy himself doesn't destroy his money, though he wants other people to do it. His wife keeps it and supports the family."

The story also includes Homos's travels abroad, and his commentaries on the societies he visits.
