= Mary E. Bradley Lane =

American feminist science fiction author and teacher

- Born: July 3, 1844; St. Mary's, Ohio, U.S.
- Died: January 6, 1930; Hamilton County, Ohio, U.S.
- Occupation(s): Writer, educator

Mary E. Bradley Lane (July 3, 1844, St Mary's, Ohio – January 6, 1930, Hamilton County, Ohio) was an American feminist science fiction teacher and author. She was one of the first women to have published a science fiction novel in the United States.

Lane's novel, Mizora: A Prophecy, was first published in 1880 as a serial in a Cincinnati newspaper, and has remained remarkable for the radicalism of the feminist utopia presented, against 19th century societal norms. She published a second novel in 1895, entitled Escanaba, which however remains lost.

== Works ==
- Mizora, Syracuse University Press; New edition (May 1, 2000) ISBN 9780815628392
- Escanaba
