= John Macnie =

Scottish-American teacher and author

John Macnie dressed for winter in February 1886 in Grand Forks, North Dakota

John MacNie (c. 1844 – 31 October 1909), also known by his pen name Ismar Thiusen under which he wrote the novel The Diothas, was an educator and science fiction writer. Born in Scotland in about 1844, he came to America in 1867 where he first obtained a job teaching Greek and Latin at a preparatory school in Newberg, New York.

== Biography ==
Originally from Stirling, MacNie was educated at the University of Glasgow; he received an honorary M.A. degree from Yale University in 1874. He was a professor at the University of North Dakota for two decades; he was hired as professor of English, French, and German in 1886, and retired as professor of French and Spanish languages and literature in 1906. The University of North Dakota's MacNie Hall was named after him. MacNie published A Treatise on the Theory and Solution of Algebraic Equations in 1876, and Elements of Geometry, Plain and Solid in 1895.

He died in Hennepin, Minnesota.
