= Elizabeth Burgoyne Corbett =

British feminist and author

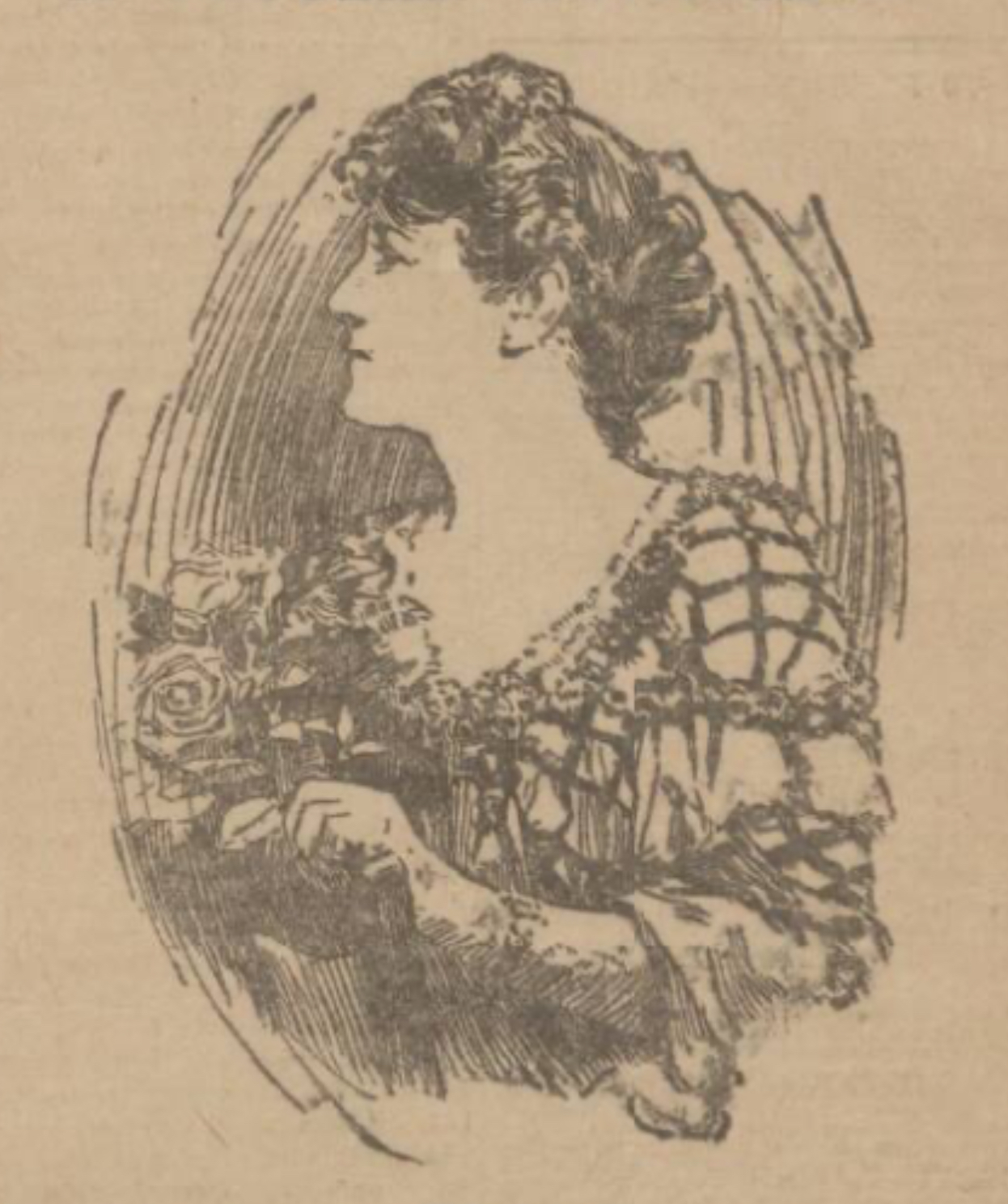
Leeds Mercury, 1906

Elizabeth Burgoyne Corbett (1846–1930), also known as Mrs George Corbett, was an English feminist writer, best known for her novel New Amazonia: A Foretaste of the Future (1889).

== Life ==
Corbett was born on 16 August 1846 near Wigan at Standishgate. Her parents were Mary (born Marsden) and Benjamin Corbett. Her father worked at a forge and she had a good education.

Corbett worked as a journalist for the Newcastle Daily Chronicle and as a popular writer of adventure and society novels. Many of her novels originated as magazine serials and not published in book form.

In June 1889, Mrs Humphry Ward's open letter "An Appeal Against Female Suffrage" was published in The Nineteenth Century with over a hundred other female signatories against the extension of Parliamentary suffrage to women. Inflamed by this "most despicable piece of treachery ever perpetrated towards women by women", Corbett wrote and published New Amazonia.

While New Amazonia was the most explicitly feminist of her novels, it was not the only one to deal with the position of women in society. Her novel When the Sea Gives Up Its Dead (1894) features one of the earliest female detectives in fiction, Annie Cory, and is itself preceded by Adventures of a Lady Detective around 1890, possibly published in a periodical. Her writing was not universally well received, but Hearth and Home listed her along with Arthur Conan Doyle as one of the masters of the art of the detective novel.

== Personal life ==
She married, in 1868, in Sheffield, George Corbett who was a fitter of steam engines and later marine engines. They had four children, of whom three survived childhood.

== Selected works ==
=== Novels ===
- The Missing Note (1881)
- Cassandra (1884)
- Pharisees Unveiled: The Adventures of an Amateur Detective (1889)
- New Amazonia: A Foretaste of the Future (1889)
- A Young Stowaway (1893)
- Mrs. Grundy’s Victims (1893)
- When the Sea Gives Up Its Dead (1894)
- Deb O’Mally’s (1895)
- Little Miss Robinson Crusoe (1898)
- The Adventures of an Ugly Girl (1898)
- The Marriage Market (1903)
- The Adventures of Princess Daintipet (1905)

=== Short story collections ===
- Adventures of a Lady Detective (1890)
- Secrets of a Private Enquiry Office (1891)
