= 2894 (novel) =

1894 novel by Walter Browne

- Author: Walter Browne
- Language: English
- Genre: Utopian fiction Speculative fiction Science fiction
- Publisher: G. W. Dillingham
- Publication date: 1894
- Publication place: United States
- Media type: Print

2894, or The Fossil Man (A Midwinter Night's Dream) is an 1894 utopian novel written by Walter Browne published in New York by G. W. Dillingham. It is one entrant in the major wave of utopian and dystopian literature that characterized the final decades of the nineteenth century.

Peering one thousand years from publication, the book describes a society where expectations of gender have evolved into a social order of "dominant women and submissive men". It an early example of speculative fiction works that considered the topic of gender roles.

According to Lyman Tower Sargent, as of the mid-1970s, 2894 was not available in any library; two copies were known to exist in private collections. However, a copy is available on the online library Archive.org.

In a review, The New York Times wrote that "Mr. Browne's imagination is vivid, and some of the situations are frankly remarkable". The Sun wrote that the book was "sprightly" and "manages to have a great deal of fun".
