= Solomon Schindler =

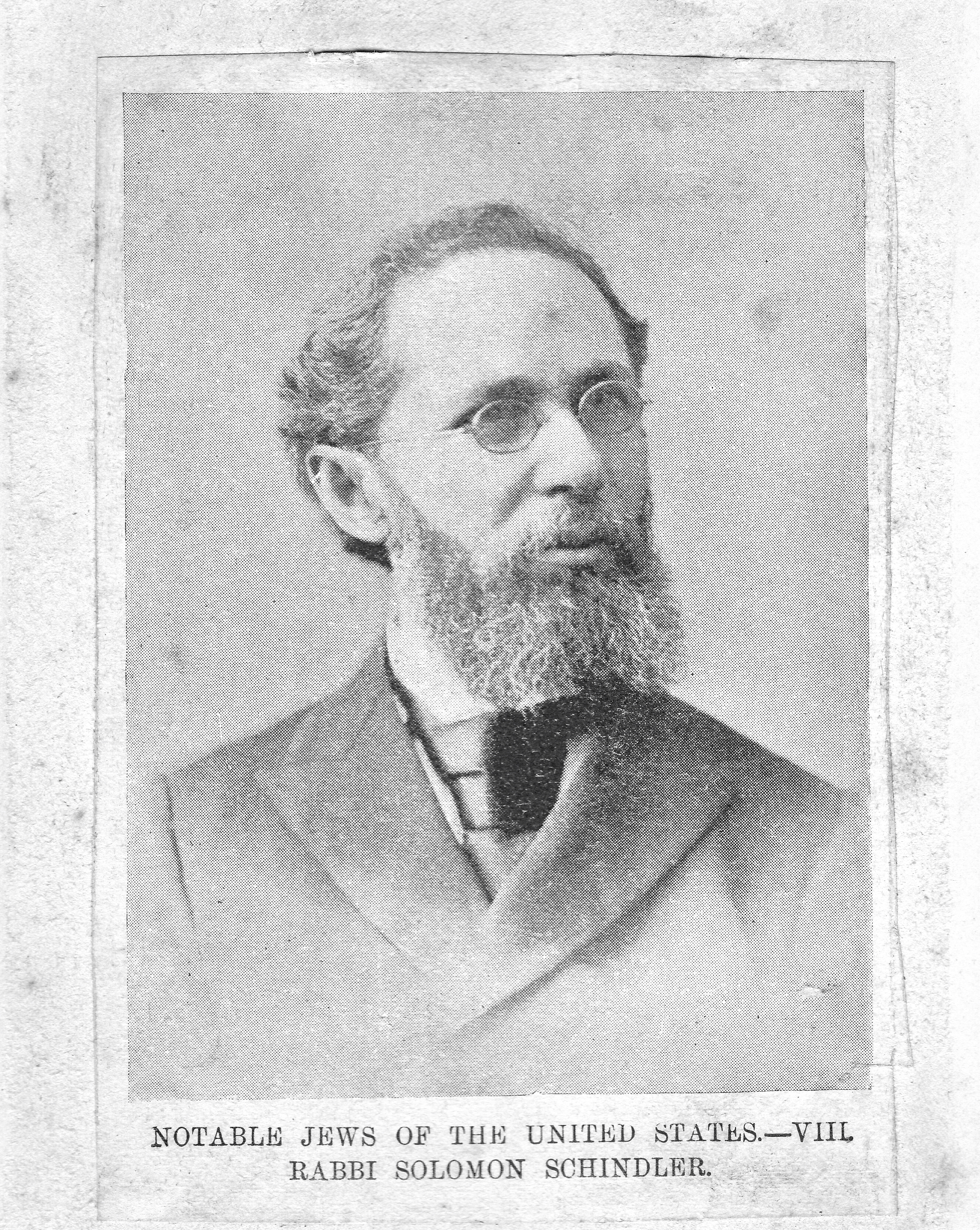
Rabbi Solomon Schindler

Solomon Schindler (1842–1915) was a rabbi and author of reform essays and a utopian novel.

== Biography ==
He was born at Neisse, Germany on April 24, 1842, and was educated at Breslau. He married Henrietta Shutz on June 24, 1868, and they had four children.

After emigrating to the United States in 1871, he served as minister of congregations at Hoboken, New Jersey, and in Boston, Massachusetts (at Temple Israel) until 1894. He was also a member of the Boston School Board during 1888–1894.

In 1894, he contributed essays to a radical magazine, The Arena. in one he advocated the nationalization of electricity, and in "Insurance and the Nation", he pointed out that the insurance industry is the best example of socialism, because it is "a social order in which the burden is borne by all in common, and in it one works for all and all work for one." (p. 380)

During 1895–1899 he was superintendent of the Federation of Jewish Charities of Boston and thenceforth until 1909, when he retired, served as superintendent of the Leopold Morse Home. He also became a Baal teshuva.

He died in Boston on May 5, 1915, and was buried at Temple Israel Cemetery in Wakefield, Massachusetts.

== Works ==
- Messianic Expectations and Modern Judaism (1886)
- Dissolving Views of the History of Judaism (1888)
- Young West: A Sequel to Bellamy's Looking Backward (1894)
