= The Human Drift =

Late nineteenth century proposal for a utopian society

- Author: King Camp Gillette
- Language: English
- Subject: Socialist utopia
- Genre: Political
- Publisher: New Era Publishing Co.
- Publication date: 1894

The Human Drift is a work of Utopian social planning, written by King Camp Gillette and first published in 1894. The book details Gillette's theory that replacing competitive corporations with a single giant publicly owned trust ("the United Company") would cure virtually all social ills.

== The plan ==
One-third of the book is devoted to Gillette's plan for an immense three-level metropolis (called "Metropolis") on the site of Niagara Falls. Designed to accommodate a population of tens of millions of inhabitants, the mega-city would draw its electric power from the Falls. (A photograph of the Falls served as the book's frontispiece.) The first large electrical generating facilities at Niagara Falls, utilizing the new alternating current system of Nikola Tesla and George Westinghouse, were being constructed at the time Gillette wrote.

Gillette's city was to possess "a perfect economical system of production and distribution," run by the United Company; it would in fact be the only city on the North American continent. Economies of scale would mean that a single one of every necessary facility — one steel mill, one shoe factory, etc. — would exist. Advances in mechanization would generate ever-greater efficiencies, and ever-greater wealth for the whole society. Social progress would be natural and inevitable; gender equality would be the rule.

Gillette gives a highly specific picture of his metropolis: it is shaped in a perfect rectangle, 135 miles on the long side and 45 on the short. Even with necessary farming and mining, most of the rest of North America outside Metropolis would be a natural environment. Gillette saw the city as containing the full population of the United States at that time, sixty million people; he also thought that the city could accept another thirty million in future population growth. Gillette wanted the buildings of Metropolis to be built of porcelain, for endurance and cleanliness. (His thinking on this point may have been influenced by the famous "White City" of the World's Columbian Exposition of 1893.) Gillette favored circular buildings, even for residences (25-floor apartment complexes), and a hexagonal street plan.

(Though the details of his plan were highly specific, Gillette was not rigidly committed to them; in a future revised version he would switch to a circular shape for his city, and raise the apartment buildings to 50 stories.)

The text of The Human Drift was accompanied with abundant illustrations and plans, a graph of the "Educational and Industrial Pyramid," and other features of Gillette's scheme.

"His book is important for the attention it received in its time," though today it is "a curiosity."

== Later books ==
Gillette continued his Utopian argument in two subsequent books, World Corporation (1910) and The People's Corporation (1924). Other works also propounded his views.

== Echota ==
Nothing approaching Gillette's Metropolis has ever been attempted; but the Niagara Falls area was the site of one planned community, a model workers' town named Echota (which means "town of refuge" in the Cherokee language). It was designed by the architectural firm of McKim, Mead, and White in 1891 and built by the Niagara Falls Power Company.
