= The Diothas =

1883 English-language utopian novel by John MacNie

- Author: John Macnie (as "Ismar Thiusen")
- Language: English
- Genre: Utopian fiction, speculative fiction, Science fiction
- Publisher: G. P. Putnam's Sons
- Publication date: 1883
- Publication place: United States
- Media type: Print (Hardcover)
- Pages: 358
- Text: The Diothas at Wikisource

The Diothas; or, A Far Look Ahead is an 1883 utopian novel written by John Macnie and published using the pseudonym "Ismar Thiusen". The Diothas has been called "perhaps the second most important American nineteenth-century ideal society" after Edward Bellamy's Looking Backward (1888).

== Synopsis ==
The novel begins with a scene in which the first-person narrator undergoes an episode of "mesmerism," or hypnosis, and wakes up in the far future; he has suddenly passed "from the nineteenth to the ninety-sixth century...." In the company of a friend and guide named Utis Estai, the narrator begins to learn the nature of this future world. He is introduced to the massive city of "Nuiorc," the future development of New York City; and he travels with his guide to Utis's home in the suburbs. He learns from Utis and others about the structure and institutions of this future society.

=== The social and technological ===
The book concentrates most of its attention on the social and technological advances of the ninety-sixth century; and some of Macnie's forecasts and predictions are notably prescient. The one most often cited in criticism and commentary is Macnie's prediction that the paved roads of the future will have white lines running down their centers to divide the traffic flow. Macnie also forecasts advances in communication, with a global telephone network, and recorded lectures by college professors, among other developments that have come to pass in the ensuing centuries. Some of Macnie's anticipations are more characteristic of the early twenty-first century, like electric cars, and rooftop gardens on public and private buildings (a feature of the modern "green building" movement).

At one point in The Diothas, the narrator meets an elderly astronomer who has developed a "calculating machine" that can draw geometric figures, and can also begin with a geometric curve and then display the formula it represents—tasks done by modern computers and computer graphics.

Macnie's future has progressive, egalitarian, and semi-socialist elements. The sexes have fairly similar rights (though only males have to perform a type of national service). Some gender roles persist; all men are given some training in law, and all women in medicine. The majority of scientists are male, the majority of artists are female. Yet women inventors have been primarily responsible for the development of varzeo and lizeo ("far-seeing" and "live-seeing")—that is, television and motion pictures.

Women do domestic laundry and cooking—but communally. The average work day is three hours long; people devote their abundant leisure time to the arts and sciences and to further education. A form of capitalism exists, though there are limits on inherited wealth. Workers in business enterprises are often shareholders also.

Macnie does envision a significant element of Puritanism in his future society, with Prohibition of alcohol and laws against marital infidelity. The author's conservative opinions are partly represented by his future. He condemns the authors Victor Hugo and Charles Dickens as "maudlin sympathizers with crime...." He even includes in his future the old Roman practice in which "the father had unquestioned power of life and death over his children."

=== The personal ===
There are personal aspects to the novel as well: the narrator meets and becomes enamored of a young woman named Reva Diotha. (She and her female relatives are "the Diothas" of the title). Cleverly, Macnie complicates the frame of his narrative: the narrator is, in his own perception, a time-traveller from the nineteenth century—but he is known by the other characters as a friend and relative named Ismar Thiusen who has developed a mental illness, and who has the delusion that he is a time-traveller from the nineteenth century. (The narrator arrives in the 96th century able to speak its altered English language, in which the name of West Point has devolved into "Uespa," St. Louis into "Salu," and Buffalo into "Falo.") Utis treats Thiusen rather like a psychiatric patient; Utis humors his friend's delusion and explains the features of their world, as a kind of therapy meant to restore Thiusen to his proper wits.

Once Thiusen and Reva Diotha are matched as a couple, they interpret his situation in terms of reincarnation.

In the end, however, Thiusen returns to the nineteenth century, after an accidental plunge over Niagara Falls. There, he is united with Edith Alston, the woman he loves.

== The Diothas and Looking Backward ==
It has long been recognized that a relationship exists between Macnie's Diothas and Bellamy's Looking Backward. Both books send their first-person protagonists to the future via hypnotism; both protagonists were, in their own time, enamored of a woman named Edith; and each becomes enamored of a future descendant of his Edith. Both novels predict similar technological developments. Macnie and Bellamy are known to have corresponded about their ideas prior to the publication of their books. In the concluding chapter of The Diothas, Edward Bellamy is the figure identified as "E—."

Macnie himself believed that Bellamy had introduced too many elements of The Diothas into his later book. Once Looking Backward proved a great best-seller after its 1888 publication, Macnie and his publisher released a second edition of their 1883 book, re-titling it Looking Forward; or, The Diothas (1890). Unfortunately, Macnie was then criticized for "plagiarizing" Bellamy's better-known work. Macnie's book tended to be confused among the many sequels and responses to Looking Backward.

There is an obvious and major difference between the two works. Bellamy set his story in the near future, and suggested a program for realizing the changes he predicted and advocated. Macnie's plot is set so many "chiliads" in the future that no program for achieving his utopia could seem feasible.

== The Diothas and The Great Romance ==
The relationship between The Diothas and Looking Backward is complicated by another prior work, The Great Romance (1881). This science-fiction novella was printed anonymously in New Zealand, and is extremely rare; it now exists only in a single copy in a library in Wellington. Yet despite the obscurity of The Great Romance, Macnie may have known of it; he makes his hero in The Diothas a native of "Maoria," the New Zealand of his future. All three of these stories share common features.

== The author ==
John Macnie (1836–1909) was born in Scotland, and educated at the University of Glasgow; he received an honorary M.A. degree from Yale University in 1874. He was a professor at the University of North Dakota for two decades; he was hired as professor of English, French, and German in 1886, and retired as professor of French and Spanish languages and literature during 1906. The University of North Dakota's Macnie Hall was named after him. Macnie published A Treatise on the Theory and Solution of Algebraic Equations in 1876, and Elements of Geometry, Plain and Solid in 1895.
