= Looking Backward =

1888 Utopian novel by Edward Bellamy

Looking Backward: 2000–1887
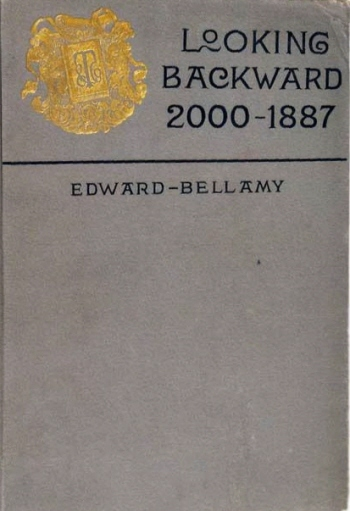
- Cover of the Ticknor & Co. first edition of Looking Backward, 2000–1887
- Author: Edward Bellamy
- Language: English
- Genre: Utopian novel Science fiction
- Publisher: • Ticknor & Co. (Jan. 1888) • Houghton Mifflin (Sept. 1889)
- Publication place: United States
- Media type: Print (hardback)
- Pages: vii, 470
- Followed by: Equality (1897)
- Text: Looking Backward: 2000–1887 at Wikisource

Looking Backward: 2000–1887 is a utopian time travel science fiction novel by the American journalist and writer Edward Bellamy first published in 1888.

The book was translated into several languages, and in short order "sold a million copies." According to historian Daniel Immerwahr, "In the 19th-century United States, only Uncle Tom's Cabin sold more copies in its first years" than Bellamy's book.

The novel inspired several utopian communities. In the United States alone, over 162 "Bellamy Clubs" sprang up to discuss and propagate the book's ideas. According to Erich Fromm, "It is one of the few books ever published that created almost immediately on its appearance a political mass movement."

Looking Backward influenced many intellectuals, and appears by title in many socialist writings of the day. Owing to its commitment to the nationalization of private property and the desire to avoid use of the term "socialism," this political movement came to be known as Nationalism (not to be confused with the political ideology of nationalism).

== Synopsis ==
Bellamy's novel is set in Boston, Massachusetts, and tells the story of a young American man named Julian West who, in 1887, falls into a deep, hypnosis-induced sleep and wakes up 113 years later. He finds himself at the same location but in a totally changed world: It is the year 2000, and while he was sleeping, the United States has been transformed into a socialist utopia. The remainder of the book outlines Bellamy's thoughts about improving the future. The major themes include problems associated with capitalism, a proposed socialist solution of a nationalization of all industry, and the use of an "industrial army" to organize production and distribution, as well as how to ensure free cultural production under such conditions.

The young man is awoken to a guide, Doctor Leete, who shows him around and explains all the advances of this new age, including drastically reduced working hours for people performing menial jobs and almost instantaneous, internet-like delivery of goods. Everyone retires with full benefits at age 45, and may eat in any of the public kitchens (realized as factory-kitchens in the 1920s–30s in the USSR). The productive capacity of the United States is nationally owned, and the goods of society are equally distributed to its citizens. A considerable portion of the book is dialogue between Leete and West wherein West expresses his confusion about how the future society works and Leete explains the answers using various methods, such as metaphors or direct comparisons with 19th-century society.

Although Bellamy's novel did not discuss technology or the economy in detail, commentators frequently compare Looking Backward with actual economic and technological developments. For example, Julian West is taken to a store which (with its descriptions of cutting out the middleman to cut down on waste in a similar way to the consumers' cooperatives of his own day based on the Rochdale Principles of 1844) somewhat resembles a modern warehouse club like BJ's, Costco, or Sam's Club. He additionally introduces a concept of credit cards in chapters 9, 10, 11, 13, 25, and 26, but these actually function like modern debit cards. All citizens receive an equal amount of "credit." Those with more difficult, specialized, dangerous, or unpleasant jobs work fewer hours. Bellamy also predicts both sermons and music being available in the home through cable "telephone" (already demonstrated but commercialized only in 1890 as Théâtrophone in France).

Bellamy's ideas somewhat reflect classical Marxism. In chapter 19, for example, he has the new legal system explained. Most civil suits have ended in socialism, while crime has become a medical issue. The idea of atavism, then current, is employed to explain crimes not related to inequality (which Bellamy thinks will vanish with socialism). Remaining criminals are medically treated. One professional judge presides, appointing two colleagues to state the prosecution and defense cases. If all do not agree on the verdict, then it must be tried again. Chapters 15 and 16 have an explanation of how free, independent public art and news outlets could be provided in a more libertarian socialist system. In one case, Bellamy even writes, "the nation is the sole employer and capitalist."

== Publication history ==
The decades of the 1870s and the 1880s were marked by economic and social turmoil, including the Long Depression of 1873–1879, a series of recessions during the 1880s, the rise of organized labor and strikes, and the 1886 Haymarket affair and its controversial aftermath. Moreover, American capitalism's tendency towards concentration into ever larger and less competitive forms—monopolies, oligopolies, and trusts—began to make itself evident, while emigration from Europe expanded the labor pool and caused wages to stagnate. The time was ripe for new ideas about economic development which might ameliorate the current social disorder.

Edward Bellamy (1850–1898), a relatively unknown New England-born novelist with a history of concern with social issues, began to conceive of writing an impactful work of visionary fiction shaping the outlines of a utopian future, in which production and society were ordered for the smooth production and distribution of commodities to a regimented labor force. In this he was not alone—between 1860 and 1887, no fewer than 11 such works of fiction were produced in the United States by various authors dealing fundamentally with the questions of economic and social organization.

Bellamy's book, gradually planned throughout the 1880s, was completed in 1887 and taken to Boston publisher Benjamin Ticknor, who published a first edition of the novel in January 1888. Initial sales of the book were modest and uninspiring, but the book did find a readership in the Boston area, including enthusiastic reviews by future Bellamyites Cyrus Field Willard of the Boston Globe and Sylvester Baxter of the Boston Herald.

Shortly after publication, Ticknor's publishing enterprise, Ticknor and Company, was purchased by the larger Boston publisher, Houghton, Mifflin & Co., and new publishing plates were created for the book. Certain "slight emendations" were made to the text by Bellamy for this second edition, released by Houghton Mifflin in September 1889.

In its second release, Bellamy's futuristic novel met with enormous popular success, with more than 400,000 copies sold in the United States alone by the time Bellamy's follow-up novel, Equality, was published in 1897. Sales topped 532,000 in the US by the middle of 1939. The book gained an extensive readership in Great Britain, as well, with more than 235,000 copies sold there between its first release in 1890 and 1935.

The Bellamy Library of Fact and Fiction, by William Reeves, a radical London publisher, printer and bookseller was a systematic effort to organize this literature. The Bellamy Library codified series of texts designed to make political works, defined by their radical content and popular appeal, both intellectually and financially accessible to working-class activists and lower- middle-class radicals. It was especially popular among working men's clubs.

The first version of the novel published in China, heavily edited for the tastes of Chinese readers, was titled Huitou kan jilüe (回頭看記略). This text was later retitled Bainian Yi Jiao (百年一覺 ), or "A Sleep of 100 Years" and in 1891–1892 this version was serialized in Wanguo gongbao; the organization Guangxuehui (廣學會; Society for Promoting Education) published these pieces in a book format. This first translation, the first piece of science fiction from a Western country published in Qing dynasty China, was done in an abridged format by Timothy Richard. The novel was again serialized in China in 1898, in Zhongguo guanyin baihua bao (中國官音白話報); and in 1904, under the title Huitou kan (Looking Backward), within Xiuxiang xiaoshuo (繡像小說; Illustrated Fiction).

The book remains in print in multiple editions, with one publisher alone having reissued the title in a printing of 100,000 copies in 1945.

== Precursors ==
Though Bellamy tended to stress the independence of his work, Looking Backward shares relationships and resemblances with several earlier works—most notably the anonymous The Great Romance (1881), John Macnie's The Diothas (1883), Laurence Gronlund's The Co-operative Commonwealth (1884), and August Bebel's Woman in the Past, Present, and Future (1886). For example, in The True Author of Looking Backward (1890) J. B. Shipley argued that Bellamy's novel was a repeat of Bebel's arguments, while literary critic R. L. Shurter went so far as to argue that "Looking Backward is actually a fictionalized version of The Co-operative Commonwealth and little more". However, Bellamy's book also bears resemblances to the early socialist theorists or 'utopian socialists' Etienne Cabet, Charles Fourier, Robert Owen, and Henri Saint-Simon, as well as to the 'Associationism' of Albert Brisbane, whom Bellamy had met in the 1870s.

== Reaction and sequels ==
On publication, Looking Backward was praised by both the American Federation of Labor and the Knights of Labor. Many members of the Knights read Looking Backward and also joined Bellamy's Nationalist clubs. Looking Backward was also praised by Daniel De Leon, Elizabeth Gurley Flynn and Upton Sinclair.

In 1897 Bellamy wrote a sequel, Equality, dealing with women's rights, education, and many other issues. Bellamy wrote the sequel to elaborate and clarify many of the ideas merely touched upon in Looking Backward.

The success of Looking Backward provoked a spate of sequels, parodies, satires, dystopian, and 'anti-utopian' responses. A partial list of these follows. The result was a "battle of the books" that lasted through the rest of the 19th century and into the 20th. The back-and-forth nature of the debate is illustrated by the subtitle of Geissler's 1891 Looking Beyond, which is "A Sequel to 'Looking Backward' by Edward Bellamy and an Answer to 'Looking Forward' by Richard Michaelis".

The book was translated into Bulgarian in 1892. Bellamy personally approved a request by Bulgarian author Iliya Yovchev to make an "adapted translation" based on the realities of Bulgarian social order. The resulting work, titled The Present as Seen by Our Descendants And a Glimpse at the Progress of the Future ("Настоящето, разгледано от потомството ни и надничане в напредъка на бъдещето"), generally followed the same plot. The events in Yovchev's version take place in an environmentally friendly Sofia and describe the country's unique path of adapting to the new social order. It is considered by local critics to be the first Bulgarian utopian work.

The book also influenced activists in Britain. Scientist Alfred Russel Wallace credited Looking Backward for his conversion to socialism. Politician Alfred Salter cited Looking Backward as an influence on his political thought.

William Morris's 1890 utopia News from Nowhere was partly written in reaction to Bellamy's utopia, which Morris did not find congenial.

Bellamy's descriptions of utopian urban planning influenced Ebenezer Howard to found the garden city movement in England, and also influenced the design of the Bradbury Building in Los Angeles.

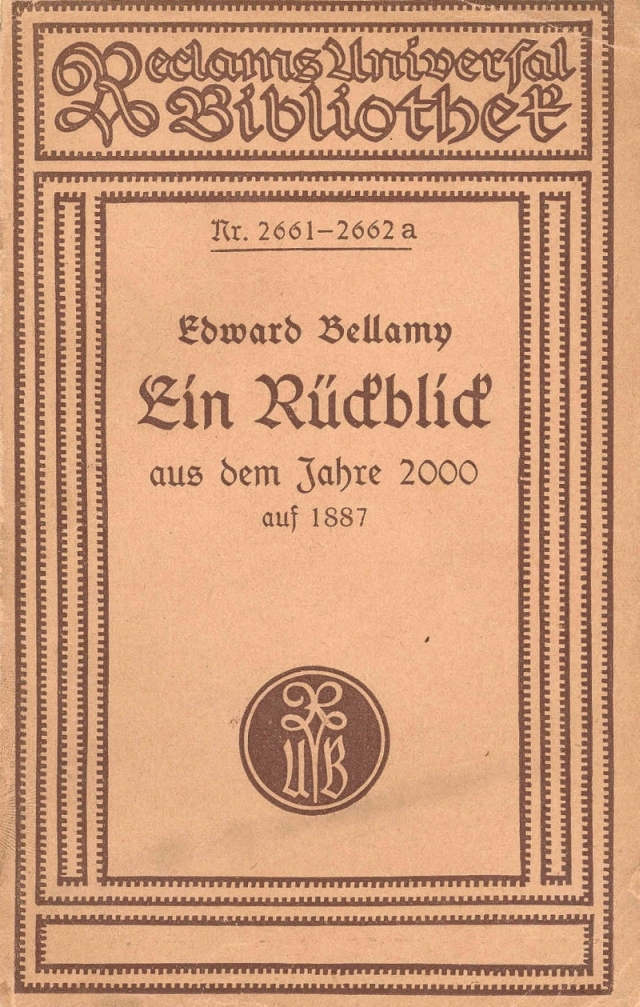
German Reclam edition 1919

During the Great Strikes of 1877, Eugene V. Debs argued that there was no essential necessity for the conflict between capital and labor. Debs was influenced by Bellamy's book to turn to a more socialist direction. He soon helped to form the American Railway Union. With supporters from the Knights of Labor and from the immediate vicinity of Chicago, workers at the Pullman Palace Car Company went on strike in June 1894. This came to be known as the Pullman Strike.

The book had a specific and intense reception in Wilhelminian Germany including various parodies and sequels, from Eduard Loewenthal, Ernst Müller and Philipp Wasserburg, Konrad Wilbrandt and Richard Michaelis.

The Russian translation of Looking Backward was banned by the Tsarist Russian censors.

In the 1930s, there was a revival of interest in Looking Backward. Several groups were formed to promote the book's ideas. The largest was Edward Bellamy Association of New York; its honorary members included John Dewey, Heywood Broun and Roger N. Baldwin. Arthur Ernest Morgan, chairman of the Tennessee Valley Authority, also admired the book and wrote the first biography of Bellamy.

== Legacy and later responses ==
Looking Backward influenced the novel Future of a New China by Liang Qichao.

Despite never mentioning the book by name in any of his works, Looking Backward postulated a socialist-fueled utopia that "confounded" Orwell, and his Nineteen Eighty-Four can be seen as a dystopian counterpoint to the utopian genre, of which Looking Backward was a progenitor.

Looking Backward was rewritten in 1974 by American socialist science fiction writer Mack Reynolds as Looking Backward from the Year 2000. Matthew Kapell, a historian and anthropologist, examined this re-writing in his essay, "Mack Reynolds' Avoidance of his own Eighteenth Brumaire: A Note of Caution for Would-Be Utopians".

In 1984, Herbert Knapp and Mary Knapp's Red, White and Blue Paradise: The American Canal Zone in Panama appeared. The book was in part a memoir of their careers teaching at fabled Balboa High School, but also a re-interpretation of the Canal Zone as a creature of turn-of-the-century Progressivism, a workers' paradise. The Knapps used Bellamy's Looking Backward as their heuristic model for understanding Progressive ideology as it shaped the Canal Zone.

A one-act play, Bellamy's Musical Telephone, was written by Roger Lee Hall and premiered at Emerson College in Boston in 1988 on the centennial year of the novel's publication. It was released as a DVD titled The Musical Telephone.

== See also ==
- Equality Colony
