= List of utopian literature =

A utopia is a community or society possessing highly desirable or perfect qualities. It is a common literary theme, especially in speculative fiction and science fiction.

The word "utopia" was coined in Greek language by Sir Thomas More for his 1516 book Utopia, but the genre has roots dating back to antiquity. One reference has it that 1500 works of fiction that can be characterized as utopian were published between 1516 and 1975.

In general, utopian societies are presented as being either in a different place (eutopia) or a different time in the future (euchronia). Most early utopian novels show a eutopia; many utopian works written after the seventeenth century show an euchronia, set in a future time when advanced technology allows a style of living on a higher plane. The role that science might play in transforming society to the better is seen in Francis Bacon's New Atlantis and Tommaso Campanella's City of the Sun. Time travel is used in some novels to reveal a utopia of the speculative future.

== Early "utopian" works ==
- Assemblywomen (391 BC) by Aristophanes - Early piece of utopian satire. Aristophanes's play mocks Athenian democracy's excesses through the story of the Athenian women taking control of the government and instituting a proto-communist utopia.
- The Republic (ca. 370-360 BC) a Socratic dialogue by Plato which eventually arrives at a thought experiment of Kallipolis, the "Beautiful City" - One of the earliest conceptions of a utopia.
- Laws (360 BC) by Plato
- The Republic (ca. 300 BC) by Zeno of Citium, an ideal society based on the principles of Stoicism.
- Sacred History (ca. 300 BC) by Euhemerus – Describes the rational island paradise of Panchaea
- Islands of the Sun (ca. 165–50 BC) by Iambulus – Utopian novel describing the features and inhabitants of the title Islands
- Life of Lycurgus (ca. 100 CE) by Plutarch
- The Peach Blossom Spring (Tao Hua Yuan) (421 CE) by Tao Yuanming
- The Virtuous City (Al-Madina al-Fadila) by Al-Farabi (874–950) – A story of Medina as an ideal society ruled by Muhammad
- The Book of the City of Ladies (1404) by Christine de Pizan – the earliest European work on women's history by a woman, and about a utopian city constructed exclusively by women's histories.

== 16th century ==
- Utopia (1516) by Thomas More which coined the modern term, referring to a "Nowhere Place". (Utopian language is used in the book.)
- Wolfaria (1521) by Johann Eberlin von Günzburg – a Lutheran utopia that levied harsh punishments on sinners
- Il mondo savio e pazzo (1552) by Anton Francesco Doni
- La Città felice (1553) by Francesco Patrizi
- A Work touching the Good Ordering of a Common Weal (1559) by Joannes Ferrarius Montanus
- Siuqila: Too Good to be True (1580) by Thomas Lupton
- Repubblica immaginaria (1580s) by Ludovico Agostini
- The Anatomie of Abuses (1583) by Stubbes (one of the first to imagine an imaginary country)
- Arcadia (or The Countess of Pembroke's Arcadia) (1590) by Sir Philip Sidney

== 17th century ==
- The City of the Sun (later published as Civitas solis) (1602) by Tommaso Campanella
- Mundus Alter et Idem (The Discovery of a New World) (1605) by Joseph Hall. Written in Latin.
- Il Belluzzi, o vero della citta felice (1615) by Lodovico Zuccolo
- Histoire du grand et admirable royaume d'Antangil (1616) attributed to Jean de Moncy – detailed description of the ordering of the island of Antangil, with a classical republic and multiple checks on power
- Christianopolis (Reipublicae Christianopolitanae descriptio) (1619) by Johann Valentin Andreae
- The City of the Sun (1623) by Tommaso Campanella – Depicts a theocratic and egalitarian society.
- La Repubblica d'Evandria (1625) by Lodovico Zuccolo
- New Atlantis (1627) by Sir Francis Bacon
- The Man in the Moone (1638) by Francis Godwin
- The Antipodes (1640) by Richard Brome. (the first utopia in English presenting gender role reversal)
- A Description of the Famous Kingdom of Macaria (1641), originally attributed to Samuel Hartlib and now to Gabriel Plattes
- Nova Solyma (1648) by Samuel Gott
- The Law of Freedom in a Platform (1652) by Gerrard Winstanley – a radical communist vision of an ideal state
- Gargantua and Pantagruel (ca. 1653–1694) by François Rabelais
- The Commonwealth of Oceana (1656) by James Harrington – a constitutionalist utopian republic in which a balanced allocation of land ensured a balanced government
- Comical History of the States and Empires of the Moon (Histoire Comique Contenant les Etats et Empires de la Lune) (1657) by Cyrano de Bergerac
- Chaos (1659) (one of first utopian novels to have positive statement about democracy)
- The Blazing World (1666) by Margaret Cavendish – Describes a utopian society in a story mixing science-fiction, adventure, and autobiography.
- The Isle of Pines (1668) by Henry Neville – Five people are shipwrecked on an idyllic island in the Southern Hemisphere.
- The History of the Sevarites or Sevarambi (1675) by Denis Vairasse
- The Southern Land Known (La Terre Australe connue) (1676) by Gabriel de Foigny
- Sinapia (1682)
- The Free State of Noland (1696) (included positive statement about democracy)
- The Adventures of Telemachus (1699) by Francois de Salignac de la Mothe Fenelon

== 18th century ==
About 30 utopian novels were published in English in the 18th century.

- Robinson Crusoe (1719) by Daniel Defoe
- A description of New Athens in Terra Australis incognita (1720) (a religious utopia)
- Gulliver's Travels (1726) by Jonathan Swift
- Nicolai Klimii Iter Subterraneum (Niels Klim's Underground Travels) (1741) by Ludvig Holberg, Baron of Holberg. Utopian novel incorporating Hollow earth beliefs. (Said to be inspiration for 1907 socialist community at Holberg, BC).
- The Adventures of Sig. Gaudentio di Lucca (1737) by Simon Berington
- The Life and Adventures of Peter Wilkins (1751) by Robert Paltock
- A General Idea of the College of Mirania (1753) by William Smith – Describes a Eutopian educational system. This is the earliest known utopia published in the United States.
- A Vindication of Natural Society (1756) by Edmund Burke
- Candide, ou l'Optimisme (1759) by Voltaire
- Rasselas (1759) by Samuel Johnson
- Millenium Hall (1762) by Sarah Scott
- An Account of the First Settlement ... of the Cessares (1764) by James Burgh
- Memoirs of the Year Two Thousand Five Hundred (original title: L'An 2440, rêve s'il en fut jamais, which translates literally to The Year 2440: A Dream If Ever There Was One) (1771) by Louis-Sébastien Mercier
- Supplément au voyage de Bougainville (1772) by Denis Diderot – A set of philosophical dialogues written by Denis Diderot, inspired by Louis Antoine de Bougainville's Voyage autour du monde. Diderot presents Bougainville's descriptions of Tahiti as a utopia, standing in contrast to European culture.
- The Adventures of Mr. Nicholas Wisdom (original title: Mikołaja Doświadczyńskiego przypadki) (1776) by Ignacy Krasicki
- A Supplement to the History of Robinson Crusoe (1782) by [Thomas Spence]. (He was also author of Description of Spensonia (1795), The Constitution of a Perfect Commonwealth (1798), The Constitution of Spensonia (1801), and The receipt to make a millennium or happy world ([1805]).
- Enquiry Concerning Political Justice (1793) by William Godwin
- Description of Spensonia (1795) by Thomas Spence

== 19th century ==
- Theory of the Four Movements (1808) by Charles Fourier
- The Empire of the Nairs (1811) by James Henry Lawrence (one of earliest novels to endorse free love)
- The Voyage to Icaria (1842) by Étienne Cabet – Inspired the Icarian movement
- Sibling Life or Brothers and Sisters (Swedish: Syskonlif; 1848) by Fredrika Bremer
- A view of the art of colonization, with present reference to the British Empire; in letters between a statesman and a colonist by Edward Gibbon Wakefield.
- Hunt, John Hale (1862). The Honest Man's Book of Finance and Politics: Showing the Cause and Cure of Artificial Poverty, Dearth of Employment, and Dullness of Trade. New York City: John Windt.
- Man’s Rights; or, How Would You Like It? (1870) by Annie Denton Cridge A socialist, agriculturally-based future where women had equal rights. One of the first utopian science fiction tales written by a woman; one of first science fiction novels written by an American; one of first utopian feminist novels.
- Vril, the Power of the Coming Race (1871) by Edward Bulwer-Lytton is an utopian Hollow Earth novel about a superior subterranean cooperative society.
- Erewhon (1872) by Samuel Butler – Satirical utopian novel with dystopian elements set in the Southern Alps, New Zealand.
- Mizora, (1880–81) by Mary E. Bradley Lane

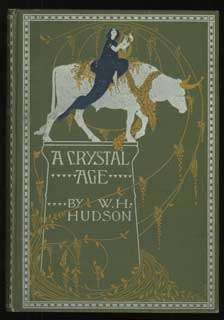
A Crystal Age, by W.H. Hudson (1906 edition cover)

- Utopia; Or, the History of an Extinct Planet, Psychometrically Explained (1884) by Alfred Denton Cridge, son of Annie Denton Cridge. One of the earliest U.S. science fiction novels
- A Crystal Age (1887), by W.H. Hudson – An amateur ornithologist and botanist falls down a crevice, and wakes up centuries later, in a world where humans live in families, in harmony with each other and animals; but, where reproduction, emotions, and secondary sexual characteristics are repressed, except for the Alpha males and females.
- Looking Backward (1888) by Edward Bellamy
- The God of Civilization: A Romance (1890) by Minnie A. Weeks Pittock. A feminist utopian novel published under the pen name M. A. Pittock.
- Freeland (1890) by Theodor Hertzka
- Gloriana, or the Revolution of 1900 (1890) by Lady Florence Dixie – The female protagonist poses as a man, Hector l'Estrange, is elected to the House of Commons, and wins women the vote. The book ends in the year 1999, with a description of a prosperous and peaceful Britain governed by women.
- News from Nowhere (1892) by William Morris – "Nowhere" is a place without politics, a future society based on common ownership and democratic control of the means of production.
- 2894, or The Fossil Man (A Midwinter Night's Dream) (1894) by Walter Browne
- A Traveler from Altruria (1894) by William Dean Howells
- Equality (1897) by Edward Bellamy
- In the New Capital (1897) by John Galbraith. set in 1897 Toronto and Ottawa, then main character time-travels to 1999 when a new Ottawa is operating under utopian socialist/single tax/temperance laws.
- The Future State: Production and Consumption in the Socialist State. (Der Zukunftsstaat: Produktion und Konsum im Sozialstaat.) (1898) by Kārlis Balodis – he adopted the pseudonym Ballod-Atlanticus from Bacon's book Nova Atlantis (1627)

== 20th century ==
- NEQUA or The Problem of the Ages by Jack Adams – A feminist utopian science fiction novel printed in Topeka, Kansas in 1900.
- The Old New Land by Theodor Herzl – A Zionist utopian novel published in 1902.
- Sultana's Dream (1905) by Begum Rokeya – A Bengali feminist Utopian story about Lady-Land.
- A Modern Utopia (1905) by H. G. Wells – An imaginary, progressive utopia on a planetary scale in which the social and technological environment are in continuous improvement, a world state owns all land and power sources, positive compulsion and physical labor have been all but eliminated, general freedom is assured, and an open, voluntary order of "samurai" rules.
- Beatrice the Sixteenth (1909) by Irene Clyde – In this feminist novel, a time traveller discovers a lost world, which is an egalitarian utopian postgender society.
- The Millennium: A Comedy of the Year 2000 (1907) by Upton Sinclair. A novel in which capitalism finds its zenith with the construction of The Pleasure Palace. During the grand opening of this 100-story edifice, an explosion kills almost everybody in the world. The eleven remaining struggle to survive in a newly-class-less society without workers and servants. A few leave to create a utopian "Cooperative Commonwealth." The others go successively through periods of small-scale slavery, feudalism and industrial capitalism before most of them leave to join the co-operators outside.
- Red Star (1908) (Russian title: Красная звезда) by Alexander Bogdanov. 1908 science fiction novel about a communist society on Mars. The first edition was published in St. Petersburg in 1908, republished in Moscow and Petrograd in 1918, and in Moscow in 1922.
- Herland (1915) by Charlotte Perkins Gilman – An isolated society of women who reproduce asexually has established an ideal state that reveres education and is free of war and domination.
- The New Moon: A Romance of Reconstruction (1918) by Oliver Onions
- Philip Dru: Administrator A Story of Tomorrow, 1920-1935 (1912) by Edward M. House. A chief advisor to U.S. President Woodrow Wilson revealed what he would do if he was "Administrator to the Republic" following a civil war in which western populist forces win and Eastern U.S. plutocrats admit defeat easily. Noteworthy in that four of the progressive reforms described in the book were enacted by the President by 1915. Counsels gradual amelioration of ills, rather than state ownership.
- The Islands of Wisdom (1922) by Alexander Moszkowski – In the novel various utopian and dystopian islands that embody social-political ideas of European philosophy are explored. The philosophies are taken to their extremes for their absurdities when they are put into practice. It also features an "island of technology" which anticipates mobile telephones, nuclear energy, a concentrated brief-language that saves discussion time and a thorough mechanization of life.
- Men Like Gods (1923) by H. G. Wells – Men and women in an alternative universe without world government in a perfected state of anarchy ("Our education is our government," a Utopian named Lion says;) sectarian religion, like politics, has died away, and advanced scientific research flourishes; life is governed by "the Five Principles of Liberty," which are privacy, freedom of movement, unlimited knowledge, truthfulness, and freedom of discussion and criticism.
- Lost Horizon (1933) by James Hilton - British official and others crash-land and enter the mythical community of Shangri-La
- The Green Child (1935) by Herbert Read - A novel based around two utopian societies: the fictional South American country of Roncador, which the protagonist gradually transforms into an idealized rural republic; and a fantastical underground realm venerating solitary philosophical meditation and the inanimate perfection of crystals.
- For Us, the Living: A Comedy of Customs (1938, published in 2003) by Robert A. Heinlein – A futuristic utopian novel explaining practical views on love, freedom, drive, government and economics.
- Islandia (1942) by Austin Tappan Wright – An imaginary island in the Southern Hemisphere, a utopia containing many Arcadian elements, including a policy of isolation from the outside world and a rejection of industrialism.
- Walden Two (1948) by B. F. Skinner – A community in which every aspect of living is put to rigorous scientific testing. A professor and his colleagues question the effectiveness of the community started by an eccentric man named T.E. Frazier.
- The Noon Universe (1961–1985) by the Strugatsky Brothers. It has been argued that the Strugatsky Brothers created their own utopian ideology based on the primacy of science. The series starts as a "socialist utopia" in which humanity has survived crises but still has problems. The conflict is between "the good and the better." In the later books of the series the utopia gradually deconstructs.
- Island (1962) by Aldous Huxley – Follows the story of Will Farnaby, a cynical journalist, who shipwrecks on the fictional island of Pala and experiences a unique culture and traditions that belong to a utopian society.
- Eutopia (1967) by Poul Anderson
- The Dispossessed: An Ambiguous Utopia (1974) by Ursula K. Le Guin - Is set between a pair of planets: one that like Earth today is dominated by private property, nation states, gender hierarchy, and war, and the other an anarchist society without private property.
- Ecotopia: The Notebooks and Reports of William Weston (1975) by Ernest Callenbach – Ecological utopia in which the Pacific Northwest has seceded from the U.S. and established itself as a new kind of society.
- Woman on the Edge of Time (1976) by Marge Piercy – The story of a middle-aged Hispanic woman who has visions of two alternative futures, one utopian and the other dystopian.
- The Probability Broach (1980) by L. Neil Smith – A libertarian or anarchic utopia
- Voyage from Yesteryear (1982) by James P. Hogan – A post-scarcity economy where money and material possessions are meaningless.
- Bolo'Bolo (1983) by Hans Widmer published under his pseudonym P.M. – An anarchist utopian world organised in communities of around 500 people
- Always Coming Home (1985) by Ursula K. Le Guin – A combination of fiction and fictional anthropology about a society in California in the distant future.
- Pacific Edge (1990) by Kim Stanley Robinson – Set in El Modena, California in 2065, the story describes a transformation process from the late twentieth century to an ecologically sane future.
- The Dinotopia series (1992–2007) by James Gurney
- The Fifth Sacred Thing (1993) by Starhawk – A post-apocalyptic novel depicting two societies, one a sustainable economy based on social justice, and its neighbor, a militaristic and intolerant theocracy.
- The Giver (1993) by Lois Lowry – Set in a society that at first appears to be a utopia free of violence and severe forms of hate but turns out to be a dystopia with euthanasia of the old and young.
- 3001: The Final Odyssey (1997) by Arthur C. Clarke – Describes human society in 3001 as seen by an astronaut who was frozen for a thousand years.

== 21st century ==
- Aria (2001–2008) by Kozue Amano – A manga and anime series set on terraformed version of the planet Mars in the 24th century. The main character, Akari, is a trainee gondolier working in the city of Neo-Venezia, based on modern-day Venice.
- Manna (2003) by Marshall Brain – Essay that explores several issues in modern information technology and user interfaces, including some around transhumanism. Some of its predictions, like the proliferation of automation and AI in the fast food industry, are becoming true. Second half of the book describes perfect Utopian society.
- The Culture series by Iain M. Banks – A science fiction book series released from 1987 through 2012. The stories centre on The Culture, a utopian, post-scarcity space society of humanoid aliens, and advanced super-intelligent artificial intelligences living in artificial habitats. The main theme is of the dilemmas that an idealistic, more-advanced civilization faces in dealing with smaller, less-advanced civilizations that do not share its ideals, and some of whose behaviour it finds barbaric. In some of the stories, action takes place mainly in non-Culture environments, and the leading characters are often on the fringes of (or non-members of) the Culture.
- Uniorder: Build Yourself Paradise (2014), by Joe Oliver. Essay on how to build the Utopia of Thomas More by using computers.
- Terra Ignota by Ada Palmer – A science fiction book series released from 2016 to 2021 drawing from renaissance humanism, the enlightenment, and the rationalist movement. Takes place in the year 2454, when the nation-state system has given way to a system of globe-spanning voluntary cultural collectives known as hives, each with their own set of laws and values.
- 'The Promise of Peace' (2020) by Esther Smith. A dystopian book that describes a corrupt Utopian government in the future. Several characters escape a compound with the help of an experienced guide. Smith plans to write a series of books under the title The Order of Utopia.
- Greg Egan's fiction frequently features post-scarcity transhuman societies such as the Amalgam-Aloof Universe featured in stories such as Riding the Crocodile and Incandescence, or the "polises" in the novel Diaspora.

== See also ==
- Utopian and dystopian fiction
- List of dystopian literature
- Utopia
- Intentional community
