= Anton Giulio Brignole-Sale =

Italian writer, poet and nobleman (1605–1662)

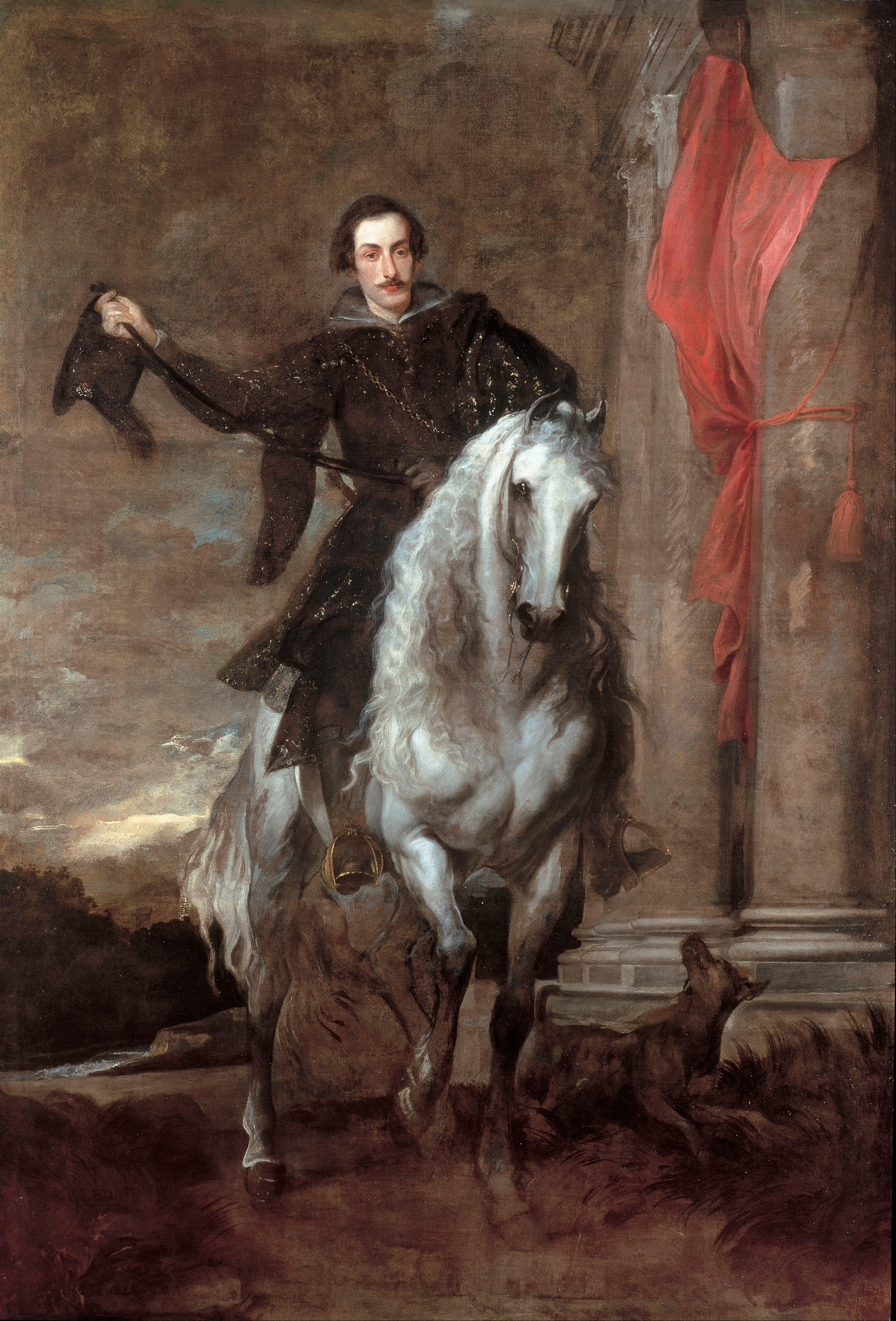
- Portrait of Anton Giulio Brignole-Sale by Anthony van Dyck, 1627
- Born: 23 June 1605; Genoa, Republic of Genoa
- Died: 20 March 1662 (aged 56); Genoa, Republic of Genoa
- Occupations: Poet; Intellectual; Civil Servant
- Spouse: Paola Adorno (m. 1625; died 1648)
- Children: 4
- Family: Brignole
- Writing career
- Language: Italian
- Genres: Poetry; pamphlet; treatise
- Notable works: La vita di Sant’Alessio; Tacito abburattato Le instabilità dell'ingegno
- Movement: Baroque

Genoese ambassador to Spain
- In office November 1643 – August 1646

Anton Giulio Brignole-Sale (23 June 1605 – 20 March 1662) was an Italian writer, poet and nobleman, senator of Genoa and Marquess of Groppoli in Tuscany.

== Biography ==
Anton Giulio Brignole-Sale was born at Genoa, June 23, 1605. He belonged to one of the wealthiest families of the Genoese nobility: in 1635 his father, Giovanni Francesco I Brignole Sale, was elected doge of Genoa. In 1608 he inherited from his maternal grandfather the fief of Groppoli and the relative title of marquess. He was officially ascribed to the Genoese aristocracy in 1626. Little is recorded of his early years, though he certainly knew Gabriello Chiabrera and Ansaldo Cebà, and was influenced by them. Anton Giulio studied under the Jesuits and had a brilliant political career. In 1643 he was made ambassador to Philip IV of Spain at a difficult period in relations between the Republic and the Spanish Empire. The positive outcome of his mission granted him access to the Great Council in 1648. Brignole aimed to renovate the structures of the republic, promote foreign trade and separate the destiny of Genoa from that of the crumbling Spanish Empire. He was a prominent member of the Academy of the Addormentati and of the Accademia degli Incogniti, and lived a literary and political life until 1652. After the death of his wife Paola Adorno, Anton Giulio resigned from the Great Council, took holy orders, and entered the Society of Jesus on March 11, 1652, leaving his unmarried children in the care of his mother. He employed the rest of his life in preaching, and died at Genoa in 1665.

The portraits of "Anton Giulio Brignole-Sale" and his wife "Paola Adorno Brignole-Sale" by Anthony van Dyck are housed in the art collection of Palazzo Rosso.

== Works ==
Anton Giulio Brignole-Sale wrote a great number of works, histories, epigrams and lives of saints, all of which have been printed, and some a great many times. His principal works are: Le Instabilità dell'Ingegno (Bologna, 1635); La Colonna per l'Anime del Purgatorio; Maria Maddalena Peccatrice e Convertita (Genoa, 1636); Tacito Abburattato (Genoa, 1643); Il Santissimo Rosario Meditato (Genoa, 1647); Della Storia Spagnuola (Genoa, 1640); Il Carnovale (Venice, 1663); Gli Due Anelli Simili (Macerata, 1671); Il Satirico Innocente (Genoa, 1648); La Vita di S. Alessio (Genoa, 1648). The last two are said to be the best, representing the tendency to simplicity which appeared in reaction against Marinism in the middle of the seventeenth century. Maria Maddalena peccatrice convertita is considered the masterpiece of the 17th-century religious novel, depicting Mary Magdalene's tormented journey to repentance convincingly and with psychological subtlety.

His most successful work, La vita di Sant’Alessio (The life of St. Alexius), was printed in Genoa in 1648 and republished several times. It was translated into French by Jean-Antoine Rampalle.

His Tacito Abburrattato (Tacitus sifted) collects Brignole's political and moral speeches held before the Academy of the Addormentati in the winter of 1635 and the following spring. It is configured as a work of reform against the excesses of Baroque culture. Brignole rejects the authority of the Ancients, in particular Tacitus, whose influence on early modern political thought and moral philosophy was paramount, and promotes a renewal of culture and society. This work was held in high esteem by Benedetto Croce, who considered Brignole "one of the most original thinkers of his century".

Brignole published his epigrams under the title: Il Satirico Innocente, Epigrammi trasportati dal Greco all'Italiano e commentati dal Marchese Anton Giulio Brignole Sale (The Satirical Innocent, Epigrams transported from the Greek to Italian and commented on by the Marquis Anton Giulio Brigliole Sale). He pretends to have discovered an ancient manuscript containing Greek epigrams on subjects "profitable to human customs", which were then translated into Latin by Paolo Domenico Chiesa, a Genoese lawyer. Needless to say the epigrams are Brignole's own. The implication of his title, however, is not without significance. The style of the Greek epigram is, as it were, held up as the model of simplicity for the poets of the new school. It is indeed only the style of the Greek epigram that Brignole would imitate; he draws no matter from the Greek Anthology. For simplicity and purity of diction Brignole's epigrams have been highly praised.

Brignole Sale's works are remarkable examples of Baroque aesthetics, for their use of the language, of the colour research, of the metaphor and the sudden image changes.

In his well-known anthology Politici e moralisti del Seicento, a work which cuts across the two fields of political theory and ethics in the seventeenth century, Benedetto Croce printed a selections from Brignole Sale's political works together with passages from the works of Strada, Zuccolo, Settala, Accetto and Malvezzi.

== Bibliography ==
- Capucci, M. (2002). "Brignole Sale, Anton Giulio". The Oxford Companion to Italian Literature. Oxford University Press.
- «Anton Giulio Brignole Sale Genovese». In : Le glorie de gli Incogniti: o vero, Gli huomini illustri dell'Accademia de' signori Incogniti di Venetia, In Venetia : appresso Francesco Valuasense stampator dell'Accademia, 1647, pp. 66–69 (on-line).
- Visconte, Giovanni Maria (1666). Alcune memorie delle virtù del padre Anton Giulio Brignole genouese della Compagnia di Giesù. Milan: appresso Lodouico Monza.
- Mazzucchelli, Giammaria (1763). "Brignole Sale (Antonio Giulio)". Gli scrittori d'Italia cioe notizie storiche, e critiche intorno alle vite, e agli scritti dei letterati Italiani. II. Bossini: 2098–2101.
- Grillo, Luigi (1846). "Anton Giulio Brignole Sale". Elogi di Liguri Illustri. 1. Forni: 227–263.
- Croce, Benedetto (1911). Saggi sulla letteratura italiana del Seicento. Bari: Laterza. pp. 386, 412 ff.
- De Caro, Gaspare (1972). "BRIGNOLE SALE, Anton Giulio". Dizionario Biografico degli Italiani (in Italian). Vol. 14: Branchi–Buffetti. Rome: Institute of the Italian Encyclopaedia. ISBN 978-88-12-00032-6.
- Hutton, James (1935). The Greek Anthology in Italy to the Year 1800. Ithaca: Cornell University Press. pp. 364–5.
- Fabrizio-Costa, Silvia, 'Du désir amoureux à l'amour de Dieu: un roman religieux d'A. Brignole Sale', in Françoise Glenission, André Rochon et Silvia Frabrizio Costa (eds), Au Pays d'Eros: Littérature et érotisme en Italie de la Renaissance à l'âge baroque (Paris: Université de la Sorbonne nouvelle, 1988)
- Corradini, Marco (1990). "La parabola letteraria di Anton Giulio Brignole Sale". Journal of Jesuit Studies. 64 (3): 395–430. JSTOR 20858559.
- Corradini, Marco (1994). Genova e il Barocco. Studi su Angelo Grillo, Ansaldo Cebà, Anton Giulio Brignole Sale. Milan: Vita e Pensiero. ISBN 9788834304525.
- Marini, Quinto (2000). Frati barocchi: Studi su A.G. Brignole Sale, G.A. De Marini, A. Aprosio, F. Frugoni, P. Segneri. Modena: Mucchi.
- Graziosi, Elisabetta (2015). "Cesura per il secolo dei genovesi : Anton Giulio Brignole Sale". Studi secenteschi. 41: 27–87. doi:10.1400/45932.
- Giovannucci, Pierluigi (2022). "Between Genoa and Milan: Giovanni Maria Visconti and His Hagiography of Anton Giulio Brignole Sale (1666)". Journal of Jesuit Studies. 9 (1): 36–52. doi:10.1163/22141332-09010003. hdl:11577/3339185. S2CID 245952378.
