= Too Like the Lightning =

2016 science fiction novel by Ada Palmer

- First edition, cover artist Victor Mosquera
- Author: Ada Palmer
- Language: English
- Series: Terra Ignota #1
- Genre: Science fiction
- Publisher: Tor Books
- Publication date: 2016
- Publication place: United States
- Pages: 432
- ISBN: 978-0765378002

Too Like the Lightning is the first novel in a science fiction quartet called Terra Ignota, written by the American author Ada Palmer. It was published on May 10, 2016. Its sequels are Seven Surrenders (2017), The Will to Battle (2017), and Perhaps the Stars (2021). The novel won the 2017 Compton Crook Award. It was a finalist for the 2017 Hugo Award for Best Novel and the James Tiptree Jr Memorial Award. The title is taken from a Shakespearean quote from Romeo and Juliet in which Juliet expresses fear that her love for Romeo has developed too quickly and might disappear as fast.

== Premise ==
In the year 2454, Earth has seen several centuries of near-total peace and prosperity. Too Like the Lightning is a fictional memoir written by self-confessed unreliable narrator Mycroft Canner, a brilliant, infamous, and paroled criminal who often serves the world's most powerful leaders. He has been commissioned by several other characters to write the "history" that the series is presented as. Mycroft frequents the Saneer-Weeksbooth home, in which an important stolen document has been planted. The mystery of why and by whom serves as a focal point which draws many different characters, vying for global power and peace, into involvement with the family. Here he encounters Bridger, a boy who seems to have miraculous abilities.

== Setting ==
Technology enabled a near-utopian golden age. There are still tensions among political groups, such as distribution of land, citizens, and income. Rather than geographic nations, people can voluntarily join Hives based on values or remain Hiveless, choosing only a minimum set of laws to adhere to. There are seven Hives: the Humanists who value achievement; Cousins, philanthropy; Masons, logic; Gordians, intelligence; Europe, national identity; Mitsubishi, land and business; and Utopians, the future. There are three groups of Hiveless who each adhere to the White, Gray, and Black laws. Each Hive has its own capital, form of government, and favored language. All are allotted representatives in the Universal Free Alliance Senate.

=== Gendered language ===
By default, almost all characters use gender-neutral language, with "they/them" the predominant pronoun used. Mycroft, the primary narrator, finds his world's obsession with gender-neutrality oppressive, so often uses gendered pronouns to refer to other characters, assigning genders based on the characters' personalities and roles. For instance, Chagatai is referred to using "she/her" pronouns because of their fierce, lioness-like strength when protecting their nephew from attack. The author has explained that Mycroft frequently "misuses" gendered pronouns, just as people in real life often make mistakes when using gender-neutral pronouns. Also, in its chapter at the start of Seven Surrenders, Sniper advises the reader to not "trust the gendered pronouns Mycroft gives people, they all come from Madame". Mycroft sometimes varies the gendered pronouns he gives characters. For instance, Carlyle is mostly referred to using she/her pronouns starting with Seven Surrenders, whereas in the first book Carlyle is referred to with he/him pronouns.

== Plot ==
Set in the year 2454, the novel is a fictional memoir written by self-confessed unreliable narrator Mycroft Canner, a brilliant, infamous, and paroled criminal who often serves the world's most powerful leaders. He has been commissioned by several other characters to write the "history" that the series is presented as. Mycroft frequents the Saneer-Weeksbooth home, in which an important stolen document has been planted, which draws many different characters, vying for global power and peace, into involvement with the family. Meanwhile, Mycroft tries to protect and conceal a child named Bridger, who has the power to make the unreal real.

== Characters ==
For a full list of the quartet's characters, see the main article for Terra Ignota.

- Mycroft Canner: a brilliant polymath and infamous convicted criminal. He serves his sentence as a Servicer, works for many of the most powerful world leaders, and secretly protects Bridger. He is thin and stooped, with curly overgrown hair, reconstructed limbs, distinctive scars, and slightly dark skin. Wears a round, shapeless hat. Thirty-one years old. Of Greek descent.
- Bridger: a 13-year-old boy who can "miracle" toys or representational objects to become real. Fair skin with blondish brown hair, very beautiful.
- The Major: the leader of toy soldiers brought to life by Bridger.
  - Lieutenant Aimer: the Major's lieutenant and second in command of the toy soldiers.
  - Croucher: a toy soldier who consistently disagrees and questions those around him.
  - Other toy soldiers: Private Pointer, Looker, Crawler, Medic, Stander Yellow, Stander Green, Nogun, and Nostand.
- Mommadoll: an animated doll who cooks and cares for Bridger and the soldiers.

== Reception ==
NPR qualifies the book as "maddening, majestic, ambitious" and the worldbuilding as a "thrilling feat", but deplored the abrupt ending. The New York Review of Science Fiction compares the narrator with Alex from A Clockwork Orange. Cory Doctorow for Boing Boing wrote that it was “more intricate, more plausible, more significant than any debut I can recall." Liz Bourke of Tor.com wrote that it is "self-aware, wickedly elegant, and intoxicatingly intelligent".

Paul Kincaid in Strange Horizons was disappointed by the gender treatment in Too Like the Lightning, deploring the direct abandon by the narrator, preferring the style in Ancillary Justice. They consider the book concepts had the potential to be "one of the most significant works of contemporary science fiction" but fails to "[live] up to its aspirations".

== Awards ==
Too Like the Lightning was a finalist for the 2017 Hugo Award for Best Novel, and won the 2017 Compton Crook Award for the best first novel in the genre published during the previous year. It was a 2017 James Tiptree Jr. Award Honors List Selection and nominated for the Goodreads Choice Award for Best Science Fiction Novel, Chicago Review of Books Award for Best Debut Novel, World Technology Award for Arts. and the Romantic Times Reviewers’ Choice Award for Best Science Fiction Novel.
