= Perhaps the Stars =

2021 science fiction novel by Ada Palmer

- Author: Ada Palmer
- Language: English
- Series: Terra Ignota #4
- Genre: Science fiction, speculative fiction
- Publisher: Tor Books
- Publication date: 2021
- Publication place: United States
- Pages: 608
- ISBN: 978-0765378064

Perhaps the Stars is the fourth novel in a science fiction quartet called Terra Ignota, written by the American author Ada Palmer. It was published on November 21, 2021. It is preceded by Too Like the Lightning (2016), Seven Surrenders (2017), and The Will to Battle (2017).

Set in the year 2454, the Earth of the Terra Ignota quartet has seen several centuries of near-total peace and prosperity, but now has been engulfed by war. Perhaps the Stars presents itself as a chronicle of this war. It is narrated by self-confessed unreliable narrator Mycroft Canner, a brilliant, infamous, and paroled criminal who often serves the world's most powerful leaders.

The title is taken from a quote by Mycroft which appears in Too Like the Lightning. In that book Mycroft reflects on the shortcomings of humanity and their ambitions to be greater and writes: "Complacent reader, we no longer aim for Earth nor Atom...". The sentence is finished by the title of the proceeding chapter "...Perhaps the Stars".

== Plot ==
The novel covers the entire world war. At the start, trackers are disabled and the car system is no longer available. Violence begins as each faction starts to self-identify with uniforms. Beginning with the new Anonymous in Romanova, the war solidifies between the Remakers (who want the Prince to lead the world) and the Hiveguard (who don't). A sub-war between Brillist Gordian and Utopia for the future of humanity is exposed - should they focus on improving life on Earth or exploring space? Some major figures from the previous books appear and are killed. J.E.D.D. Mason eventually unites the world, ends the war, and builds a new global structure, more balanced and hopefully able to last many more centuries.

== Reception ==
Kirkus Reviews described Perhaps the Stars as "curiously compelling but not entirely satisfying," criticizing the characters and worldbuilding. Publishers Weekly calls the novel "spellbinding" and the ending "satisfying," calling Palmer's prose "byzantine" and "lyrical."
