= Inventing the Renaissance =

2025 book by Ada Palmer

Inventing the Renaissance: The Myth of a Golden Age is a 2025 popular history by historian and science fiction author Ada Palmer, exploring the origin of the idea of the Renaissance. It was first published by the University of Chicago Press.

== Inspiration ==
Palmer wrote the book as an expansion of a blog post in which she responded to journalists who had asked her whether the COVID-19 pandemic would lead to "economic boom times", as a parallel to their assumption that the Renaissance had been a consequence of the Black Death; Palmer noted that "(t)he worst questions actually require really good, thorough answers."

== Reception ==
Inventing the Renaissance won the 2026 Hugo Award for Best Related Work. (Note: Palmer argues that Inventing the Renaissance is related to science fiction and fantasy in four ways: it openly mentions concepts from modern science fiction, such as time travel; it explores the historical sources of various concepts of magic currently used in modern fantasy; it traces the origin of the idea that history comes in predictable cycles, with "an excellent deep past, followed by a crisis or fall and then a dark age (and then a) new but fragile better age", which is common in fantasy and science fiction both; and it is written using narrative techniques which were developed in science fiction and fantasy.)

James Nicoll stated that a book on this topic "could have been deadly dull, but it isn't. It's never boring," and emphasized that after reading it, he "better understood the era... and was even further from considering it a golden age." Cory Doctorow lauded it as "stunning" and "such an ambitious book", with "sensitive, beautifully researched and written accounts of the lives of [historical] figures."

The Sydney Morning Herald commended Palmer's discussion of Renaissance-era interpretations of Lucretius, and considered that she "largely succeeded" in making the book entertaining, but faulted its "somewhat performative tone" which may not appeal to "readers who prefer a quieter, more reserved and less self-referential style", and concluded that "in clamouring for cool, [Palmer] seems at times to be trying too hard."

Writing in The New Yorker, Adam Gopnik praised Palmer for "know[ing] how to make a [small] story matter", and described her writing as "mostly compelling" and as having "many (...) charms", but found her inclusion of herself in the narrative to be "obstructive", comparing it to selfies in which the photographer blocks the view of the items of interest; as well, Gopnik called Palmer "weirdly off base" on topics such as the evolution of visual arts.
