= Seven Surrenders =

2017 science fiction novel by Ada Palmer

- First edition, cover art by Victor Mosquera
- Author: Ada Palmer
- Language: English
- Series: Terra Ignota #2
- Genre: Science fiction, speculative fiction
- Publisher: Tor Books
- Publication date: 2017
- Publication place: United States
- Pages: 400
- ISBN: 978-0765378026

Seven Surrenders is the second novel in a science fiction quartet called Terra Ignota, written by the American author Ada Palmer. It was published on November 28, 2017. It was a finalist for the 2018 Locus Award for Best Science Fiction Novel. It is preceded by Too Like the Lightning (2016) and followed by The Will to Battle (2017) and Perhaps the Stars (2021).

The Earth of the Terra Ignota quartet has seen several centuries of near-total peace and prosperity. Set in the year 2454, Seven Surrenders is the second half of a fictional memoir written by self-confessed unreliable narrator Mycroft Canner, a brilliant, infamous, and paroled criminal who often serves the world's most powerful leaders. He has been commissioned by several other characters to write the "history" that the series is presented as.

Seven Surrenders describes the final three days of Mycroft's history of the "seven days of transformation", March 27–29, 2454. What began as an oddly obvious minor crime turns out to be a revenge plot thirty years in the making, which threatens to unravel the global system of government. The centuries-long golden era has been propped up by sanctioned assassinations, the death of a few for the good of the many. But as the Hives begin to fall, everyone will have to choose a side in the impending global war.

== Setting ==
Advanced technology has led to the advent of a near-utopian golden age. However, there are still tensions among political groups, such as distribution of land, citizens, and income. Rather than geographic nations, people can voluntarily join Hives based on values or remain Hiveless, choosing only a minimum set of laws to adhere to. There are seven Hives: the Humanists who value achievement; Cousins, philanthropy; Masons, logic; Gordians, intelligence; Europe, national identity; Mitsubishi, land and business; and Utopians, the future. There are three groups of Hiveless who each adhere to the White, Gray, and Black laws. Each Hive has its own capitol, form of government, and favored language. All are allotted representatives in the Universal Free Alliance Senate.

=== Gendered language ===
By default, almost all characters use gender-neutral language, with "they/them" the predominant pronoun used. Mycroft, the primary narrator, finds his world's obsession with gender-neutrality oppressive, so often uses gendered pronouns to refer to other characters, assigning genders based on the characters' personalities and roles, as they relate to traditional Western gender roles. For instance, Chagatai is referred to using "she/her" pronouns because of their fierce, lioness-like strength when protecting their nephew from attack. The author has explained that Mycroft frequently "misuses" gendered pronouns, just as people in real life often make mistakes when using gender-neutral pronouns. Also, in its chapter at the start of Seven Surrenders, Sniper advises the reader to not "trust the gendered pronouns Mycroft gives people, they all come from Madame". Mycroft sometimes varies the gendered pronouns he gives characters. For instance, Carlyle is mostly referred to using she/her pronouns starting with Seven Surrenders, whereas in the first book Carlyle is referred to with he/him pronouns.

== Plot ==
Seven Surrenders describes the final three days of Mycroft's history of the "seven days of transformation", March 27–29, 2454.

=== March the twenty-seventh (continued) ===
Sniper awakens paralyzed inside a lifedoll box as a gift from Dominic Seneschal to Julia Doria-Pamphilli.

Ockham meets with Ganymede, Andō, and European Prime Minister Casimir Perry, to discuss what steps should be taken in the face of recent events. They propose using O.S., the nickname for the Saneer-Weeksbooth's secret system of strategic assassinations which has maintained world peace for almost three centuries.

Carlyle finds herself lured into a meeting with Dominic, her newly reassigned sensayer. The session is interrupted by the arrival of the Utopian Voltaire Seldon, who had tracked the Canner Device to Dominic's room. After breaking her down thoroughly, Dominic convinces Carlyle to work with her to harness Bridger's power for J.E.D.D. Mason. Desperate to preserve Bridger, Mycroft tries to get through to Carlyle, but she switches off her tracker before he can finish.

A flashback to thirteen years ago depicts the scene at Madame's when the world leaders decided Mycroft's sentence after his murder spree.

Mycroft finds Saladin in custody at Madame's. Cornel MASON demands an explanation about Apollo Mojave's coat and the immense number of lethal weapons stored within it. Mycroft reveals that the Mardi bash' had been preparing for global war.

After Sniper's kidnappers return it, the Saneer-Weeksbooth bash' holds a meeting of O.S. to decide whether or not to obey President Ganymede's potential hit order. Carlyle is discovered hiding and listening in. Thisbe drags her away and coerces Carlyle to confess her role as Conclave Head Julia Doria-Pamphili's pawn. Bridger sneaks into Madame's but Mycroft declines to be rescued.

At the Utopian Transit Network with Guildbreaker and Papadelias, a Cartesian set-set unintentionally reveals the breadth and depth of O.S.'s impact. Since the Saneer-Weeksbooth transit system began using Cartesian set-sets 244 years ago, they have caused 2,204 deaths and also saved the world dozens of times. Papa convinces Carlyle to share her recording of the bash's recent meeting. Weighing the consequences, J.E.D.D. Mason, Guildbreaker, Papa, and the Utopians agree to set a trap around O.S.'s next target.

=== March the twenty-eighth ===
Sniper visits Faust at Brill's Institute. They debate about current events and faction tensions, before finding Tully Mojave giving another soapbox speech. With millions of fans watching, Sniper joins in and supports Tully.

Julia Doria-Pamphili calls the Mitsubishi set-sets to negotiate the situation they've caused at the CFB. Carlyle is eavesdropping and confronts Julia. Papadelias arrests the Conclave Head, but not before she reveals who Carlyle's biological mother is.

The world leaders, including newly inducted Casimir Perry, assemble at Madame's. All the secrets they've been keeping from each other, including O.S., are revealed. Carlyle sneaks in and confronts Danaë. Casimir Perry reveals himself to be Merion Kraye, a disgraced European politician who assaulted Danaë and fathered Carlyle. After faking his own death and clawing his way back into power with a new identity, Perry-Kraye stole the Seven-Ten list in order to expose O.S. and destroy Andō and Ganymede. He also reveals that the Mitsubishi set-sets were originally developed to interface with the Canner Device as an alternative assassination system, before they were scattered by the Cousins and reunited by Andō and Danaë.

Perry-Kraye drags Ganymede out a window, but Sniper catches them. Perry-Kraye had lured Sniper there and ordered O.S. to assassinate the next target, falling into Papa's trap. As the world leaders and Mycroft are caught together on Sniper's ever-present cameras, the scandal of Madame's is revealed to the world.

A car crash victim's bash' destroys the backup transit system. Ockham, now Prospero, passes the leadership of O.S. to Sniper.

=== March the twenty-ninth ===
Martin Guildbreaker and Papadelias arrive to arrest the Saneer-Weeksbooths, but Sniper, Lesley, Sydney, and one of the Typers have fled. Thisbe and Croucher tell Papa about Bridger. He sees the similarities and realizes that Saladin is alive.

Carlyle goes to J.E.D.D. Mason's house and they discuss the latter's guest-godhood. Cornel MASON and Mycroft discuss Apollo's secrets at their tomb. An ambush by Papadelias separates Bridger from the Major.

With Sniper's help, Tully Mojave orates from the Rostra in Romanova. J.E.D.D. Mason interrupts and begins to give a report to the world. He is assassinated by Sniper, who declares that J.E.D.D. Mason posed a threat to the Hive system. Sniper escapes. Bridger appears and resurrects J.E.D.D. Mason before disappearing again.

Mycroft presents seven scenes, of the titular seven surrenders:

1. Vice President Brody DeLupa goes rogue and begs for the Humanist Hive to be dissolved, forcing the Anonymous to reveal their identity and cool the situation.
2. After the Mardi murders thirteen years earlier, Felix Faust decides to make J.E.D.D. Mason the centerpiece of the next Brillist Brain bash'.
3. In the Alliance Senate, Bryar Kosala details the corruption of the CFB and advocates dissolving the Cousins. Heloïse interrupts and offers an interim Constitution drafted by J.E.D.D. Mason. During Heloïse's speech, the European Parliament and its officials are destroyed by missiles at the behest of Perry-Kraye.
4. Twenty-two years before, the male world leaders discuss Madame's pregnancy and its political ramifications. Cornel MASON offers to make the baby imperial Porphyrogene.
5. After the bombing of the European Parliament, the King of Spain arrives to pick up the pieces. Crown Prince Leonor died in the blast, leaving J.E.D.D. Mason next in line.
6. Thirteen years earlier, Mushi Mojave surrenders to Madame and negotiates terms on behalf of the Utopians.
7. The night of the assassination and bombing, Tōgenkyō is subsumed in riots. Papadelias prepares to arrest the Mitsubishi Directorate. The Directors realize they can save the Hive by handing power to J.E.D.D. Mason. Finding a way to survive yet resist, Andō gives leadership to Dominic Seneschal instead.

In the hospital, Papa updates Mycroft on the coups and informs him he is the new Anonymous. Julia Doria-Pamphilli was nearly killed. Sniper turned out to be one of Bridger's animated dolls. Dominic Seneschal is hospitalized after chasing and killing it. Cornel MASON and Madame discuss her motivations and end their relationship. J.E.D.D. Mason, having realized that death does not destroy each person's potential universe, declares that he will accept the powers given to him, orders Mycroft to kill Sniper, and decides to publish the truth about all that has occurred so everyone can make informed choices about which side of the war to join.

Mycroft finds a distraught Bridger hiding in the Sniper Doll Museum. Bridger puts on the uniform of a World War II soldier and transforms himself into the Major, who is revealed to be the legendary hero Achilles. Mycroft and Achilles mourn the loss of Bridger, then begin to plan for the war to come.

== Characters ==
For a full list of the quartet's characters, see the main article for Terra Ignota.

- Mycroft Canner: a brilliant polymath and infamous convicted criminal. He serves his sentence as a Servicer, works for many of the most powerful world leaders, and secretly protects Bridger. He is thin and stooped, with curly overgrown hair, reconstructed limbs, distinctive scars, and slightly dark skin. Wears a round, shapeless hat. Thirty-one years old. Of Greek descent.
- Bridger: a 13-year-old boy who can "miracle" toys or representational objects to become real. Fair skin with blondish brown hair, very beautiful.
- The Major: the leader of toy soldiers brought to life by Bridger.
  - Lieutenant Aimer: the Major's lieutenant and second in command of the toy soldiers.
  - Croucher: a toy soldier who consistently disagrees and questions those around him.
  - Other toy soldiers: Private Pointer, Looker, Crawler, Medic, Stander Yellow, Stander Green, Nogun, and Nostand.
- Mommadoll: an animated doll who cooks and cares for Bridger and the soldiers.

=== Cousins Hive ===
- Carlyle Foster: a sensayer (spiritual counselor). Becomes a spiritual and ethical guide for Bridger. Blonde and gaunt, thirty-one years old, of European descent. A male assigned he/him and she/her pronouns in different periods of the narrative.
- Bryar Kosala: Chair of the Cousins Hive. Looks tall and imperious, but is deeply kind. Spouse of Vivien Ancelet. Of Indian descent.
- Lorelai "Cookie" Cook: Romanova's Minister of Education. A Nurturist faction leader, opposing the creation of set-sets.
- Darcy Sok: Cousins' Feedback Bureau Chief.

=== European Hive ===
- Isabel Carlos II a.k.a. Spain: King of Spain and former prime minister of the European Hive. 59 years old, with nearly black hair. Of Spanish and Chinese descent.
- Casimir Perry: the unpopular, "second-choice" Prime Minister of the European Hive.
- Julia Doria-Pamphili: Head of the Sensayers' Conclave a.k.a. Pontifex Maxima (high priestess). A vocateur specializing in intense one-shot sessions and Mycroft's court appointed sensayer. Expresses a distinctly feminine gender. Of Italian descent.
- Ektor Carlyle 'Papa' Papadelias: Romanovan Commissioner General. Obsessed with the details of Mycroft's case. One hundred and two years old. Of Greek descent. A female assigned 'he' pronouns.

=== Gordian Hive ===
- Felix Faust: Headmaster of the Brillist Institute & Gordian Hive. Seventy-eight years old with a voyeuristic, playful, and sarcastic nature. Of European descent.

=== Hiveless ===
People who, either by choice or by youth, are not part of any Hive.

- Jehovah Epicurus Donatien D'Arouet "J.E.D.D." Mason: Strange but brilliant. A Graylaw Tribune, Familiaris Candidus, and shadow co-leader of every Hive. Wears all black, unfrilly 18th century clothing. Other names/titles used by various Hives include: Jed, Tai-Kun, Xiao Hei Wang, Jagmohan, T.M., Mike, Porphyrogene, '`Aναξ (Anax). Twenty-one years old.
- Dominic Seneschal a.k.a. Canis Domini, Hound of the Lord: A polylaw investigator, sensayer, and J.E.D.D. Mason's abrasive personal valet. A Blacklaw with aggressive, anachronistic style: brown hair in a ribboned ponytail, all-black 18th century European clothes, and a rapier. A female assigned 'he' pronouns; intensely masculine in gender expression.
- Gibraltar Chagatai: J.E.D.D. Mason's chef and housekeeper. A Blacklaw male whom the narrator assigns 'she' pronouns. Of Mongolian descent.
- Vivien Ancelet: Appointed for life as the Censor (master of the census) of Romanova and secretly the Anonymous. Spouse of Bryar Kosala. Wears slim, shoulder-length dreadlocks. Of French and African descent.
- The Anonymous a.k.a. the Comte Déguisé: An extremely well-respected political commentator. A role, not an individual, and therefore not a member of any Hive. Elected Vice President of the Humanist Hive by proxy.
- "Madame" Joyce Faust D'Arouet: J.E.D.D. Mason's biological mother and madam of the Gendered Sex Club.Blacklaw. Wears a large white wig, elaborate gowns, many gems, and doll-like makeup.
- Saladin: Mycroft's ba'sib, lover, and secret accomplice. Thought dead since childhood by all but Mycroft. Wears Apollo Mojave's Utopian coat, full of weapons. Of Greek descent.
- Heloïse D'Arouet: a nun who lives at Madame's, devoted to J.E.D.D. Mason.

=== Humanists Hive ===
- Ganymede Jean-Louis de la Trémouïlle: Duke President of the Humanist Hive. Brother of Danaë Marie-Anne de la Trémouïlle. He wears ostentatious 18th century garb to complement his blue eyes and golden shoulder-length hair. Of French descent.
- Brody DeLupa: Proxy Vice President for the Anonymous.

==== The Saneer-Weeksbooth bash'house (family) ====
A Humanist bash' which invented the global flying car system and has run it for almost 400 years. Their home and headquarters is in the "Spectacle City" of Cielo de Pájaros, Chile. The current members' parents and predecessors all recently died in a white-water rafting accident.

- Ockham Prospero Saneer: the leader of the Saneer-Weeksbooth bash'. Quite muscular and knightly, Ockham possesses the extremely rare right to use lethal force. His Humanist boots are steel and leather. Of Indian and possibly Mestizo descent.
- Thisbe Ottila Saneer: another of Bridger's secret protectors and a witch. Besides helping her bash' run the cars, Thisbe is an award-winning "smelltrack" creator for movies. Black-haired, dark-skinned, and confident. Her Humanist boots depict a mountainous brush-pen landscape. Of Indian and possibly Mestizo descent.
- Ojiro Cardigan Sniper: Second in command of the Saneer-Weeksbooths, a world-famous athlete, performance artist, model, and professional living doll. Sniper is genderfluid and intersex but Mycroft assigns 'he' pronouns to parallel with rivals, Ockham and Ganymede; 'it' pronouns from Seven Surrenders onwards. Sniper's Humanist boots are leather rimmed with metallic stripes for his Olympic medals. Of Japanese, European, and South American descent.
- Cato Weeksbooth: a brilliant but unstable science teacher. Volunteers at the Museum of Science and Industry (Chicago), teaching children. His Humanist boots are made of Griffincloth and display various internal anatomy of feet. Of Chinese descent.
- Eureka Weeksbooth: a Cartesian set-set who directly interfaces with the car system data via sight, sound, smell, touch, temperature, and taste. Female and assigned 'they' pronouns. Of Chinese descent.
- Lesley Juniper Sniper Saneer: adopted by the Saneer-Weeksbooths after her own bash' was killed in a flying car accident. A compulsive doodler. Ockham's spouse. Energetic, with curly black hair. Her Humanist boots are made of screen cloth, on which doodles change every day. Of Chinese and African ancestry.
- The bash has additional family members who appear only briefly in this volume of the series: Sidney Koons, Kat Typer, and Robin Typer.

=== Masonic Hive ===
- Cornel MASON: Emperor. Black-haired and bronze-skinned, he wears a square-breasted suit in an exclusive shade of iron gray. His black right sleeve indicates his sole right to order execution. His left foot is prosthetic, the original having been removed during the Masonic Testing of the Successor.
- Mycroft 'Martin' Guildbreaker: A polylaw investigator for Romanova and Minister to J.E.D.D. Mason. A Familiaris Regni and Nepos one of the Emperor's inner circle and absolute subject of his will. The first permanent participant in the Annus Dialogorum, the Masonic rite of logical argument. Thirty-two years old. Of Persian descent.

=== Mitsubishi Hive ===
- Hotaka Andō Mitsubishi: Chief Director of the Mitsubishi Executive Directorate, husband of Danaë Marie-Anne de la Trémouïlle. Of Japanese descent.
- Danaë Marie-Anne de la Trémouïlle Mitsubishi: A world famous beauty, incredibly adept at social manipulation and gentle interrogation. Named for the Danaë of Greek mythology. Blonde-haired and blue-eyed. Intensely and expressively feminine. Of French descent.

==== Andō and Danaë's adopted children, unfinished "Oniwaban" set-sets ====
- Harue Mitsubishi
- Hiroaki Mitsubishi: In training with the Cousins' Feedback Bureau, education section. Her sleeveless Brill sweater indicates her skill at math. Of Southeast Asian descent.
- Jun Mitsubishi: Rejected from Brill's Institute. Applied for secretary's post with Gordian's Brain 'bash. In Too Like the Lightning, described as European and freckled. In Seven Surrenders, described as classically Japanese.
- Masami Mitsubishi: An intern at the Black Sakura and writer of the fake stolen Seven-Ten list. Dark-skinned, of Japanese Ainu descent.
- Michi Mitsubishi: Interning with Europe's Parliament.
- Naō Mitsubishi
- Ran Mitsubishi: Attempted to work in Ganymede's offices but was rejected. Of Middle Eastern descent.
- Setsuna Mitsubishi
- Sora Mitsubishi: Personal secretary to the Humanist Praetor in Romanova.
- Toshi Mitsubishi: An analyst with the Censor's office and Graylaw Hiveless. Wears her hair in many small twists and a Japanese nation-strat insignia. Of African and European descent.

=== Utopian Hive ===
- Aldrin Bester: A Utopian investigator, wears a coat depicting a space city. A Familiaris Candidus, in the Emperor's inner circle but not subject to his capital powers. Named for astronaut Buzz Aldrin and science fiction author Alfred Bester.
- Voltaire Seldon: A Utopian investigator, wears a coat depicting swampy ruins. A Familiaris Candidus, in the Emperor's inner circle but not subject to his capital powers. Named for philosopher Voltaire and economist Arthur Seldon.
- Mushi Mojave: First entomologist on Mars, wears a coat depicting billions of ants. One of Apollo's ba'pas.

=== Mardi bash' (multi-hive) ===
A bash' of virtuosos obsessed with war, each brilliant in their respective fields. Neighbors of Mycroft's foster bash' and the victims of his murder spree. All but one are deceased at the beginning of the narrative, but are often mentioned.

- Apollo Mojave: Utopian. Named for the Greek god Apollo and the Mojave desert. Golden-haired. Fifteen years older than Mycroft.
- Aeneas Mardi: A Romanovan Senator. Stabbed to death on the Ides of March. Body left on the Altar of Peace.
- Chiasa Mardi: Historian. Mason.
- Geneva Mardi: Senator. Mason raised by Cousins. Crucified.
- Ibis Mardi: Had been in love with Mycroft. Would have become a Cousin. One year younger than Mycroft.
- Jie Mardi: Historian. Chinese water torture. Mitsubishi.
- Jules Mardi: Historian. Mason.
- Ken Mardi: A prodigy and would-be swordsman. Kohaku's biological child. Four years younger than Mycroft. Dismembered and left to freeze in the Arctic at thirteen years old.
- Kohaku Mardi: An analyst in the Censor's office. Poisoned, then seppuku'd himself and wrote the point-of-no-return statistics on a wall in their blood. A female assigned 'he' pronouns.
- Laurel Mardi: The golden boy of the bash's younger generation. Dismembered, guillotined, and fed to Mycroft's dog. Three years younger than Mycroft.
- Leigh Mardi: Cousin. Fed to lions in the Great African Reservation.
- Luther Mardigras: Professional party-thrower. Tully's father. Tortured and dismembered over the course of five days and finally burned in a wicker man.
- Mercer Mardi: A Gordian and Brillist Fellow. Tully's mother. Vivisected.
- Makenna Mardi: Historian. Jug-and-funnel water torture.
- Malory Mardi: Humanist.
- Seine Mardi: Apollo's lover. Humanist. Killed in battle against Mycroft and Saladin.
- Tully Mardi/Mojave: The last surviving Mardi, hidden by the Utopians in Luna City on the Moon for the thirteen years since the murder spree. Graylaw Hiveless. Tall and dependent on crutches from growing up in low gravity. Nine years younger than Mycroft.

== Reception ==
Liz Bourke of Tor.com wrote that it is "playfully baroque, vividly characterised, and possessed of a lively sense of humour," though she criticized its density. Kirkus Reviews described it as, "Rich food for thought; perhaps not entirely digestible." Publishers Weekly likewise praised it as "many-layered and engrossing," but convoluted.

== Awards ==
Seven Surrenders was a finalist for the 2018 Locus Award for Best Science Fiction Novel.
