= The Will to Battle =

2017 science fiction novel by Ada Palmer

- First edition, cover artist Victor Mosquera
- Author: Ada Palmer
- Language: English
- Series: Terra Ignota #3
- Genre: Science fiction, speculative fiction
- Publisher: Tor Books
- Publication date: 2017
- Publication place: United States
- Pages: 352 pp
- ISBN: 9781786699565

The Will to Battle is the third novel in a science fiction quartet called Terra Ignota, written by the American author Ada Palmer. It was published on December 19, 2017. It was a finalist for the 2018 Locus Award for Best Science Fiction Novel. It is preceded by Too Like the Lightning (2016) and Seven Surrenders (2017). It is followed by Perhaps the Stars (2021).

Set in the year 2454, the Earth of the Terra Ignota quartet has seen several centuries of near-total peace and prosperity, but is preparing to go to war. The Will to Battle presents itself as a chronicle of those global escalations and preparations. It is narrated by self-confessed unreliable narrator Mycroft Canner, a brilliant, infamous, and paroled criminal who often serves the world's most powerful leaders.

After the events of Seven Surrenders, the world is experiencing escalating tensions, threatening to burst into war at any provocation. Sides are formed: Sniper's Hiveguard and J.E.D.D. Mason's Remakers. All sides agree to a truce until the Olympic Games in August, in order to prepare and reduce the lethality of the war. The novel ends with a ceremony, an attack, and the world newly at war.

== Setting ==
Advanced technology has led to the advent of a near-utopian golden age. However, the tensions among political groups, such as over distribution of land, population, and income, has escalated into preparations for a global war. Though there were initially seven Hives, they have each shifted into new governance systems or collapsed.

The Will to Battle takes place over a much longer timespan than the previous two books combined. The events occur between April 8 and September 6, 2454, and were written between July 6 and September 14, 2454.

=== Gendered language ===
By default, almost all characters use gender-neutral language, with "they/them" the predominant pronoun used. Mycroft, the primary narrator, finds his world's obsession with gender-neutrality oppressive, so often uses gendered pronouns to refer to other characters, assigning genders based on the characters' personalities and roles, as they relate to traditional Western gender roles. For instance, Chagatai is referred to using "she/her" pronouns because of their fierce, lioness-like strength when protecting their nephew from attack. The author has explained that Mycroft frequently "misuses" gendered pronouns, just as people in real life often make mistakes when using gender-neutral pronouns. Also, in its chapter at the start of Seven Surrenders, Sniper advises the reader to not "trust the gendered pronouns Mycroft gives people, they all come from Madame". Mycroft sometimes varies the gendered pronouns he gives characters. For instance, Carlyle is mostly referred to using she/her pronouns starting with Seven Surrenders, whereas in the first book Carlyle is referred to with he/him pronouns.

=== Style ===
The "history" of the first two books were written for contemporaneous public release; this volume has been written for posterity. Thus it is ostensibly less closely edited by the Ninth Anonymous (9A). This is marked by several stylistic changes, including the presentation of more conversations as simple dialogues, as if in a script. The Ninth Anonymous, Mycroft's apprentice, narrates the final chapter.

The novels make frequent direct addresses to a "reader", inspired by eighteenth-century literature. However, the reader is not the actual reader of the book, but an imagined in-universe reader whom Mycroft supposes is either his contemporary or someone in his future. Mycroft's sanity is waning and throughout the text he has numerous dialogues with deceased friends, such as several of the Mardi bash', Thomas Hobbes, the reader, and sometimes conversations among these.

== Plot ==
=== April ===
Ten days after the events of Seven Surrenders, newly elected Humanist President Vivien Ancelet visits Ockham, now Prospero, Saneer in prison. They discuss the legal details of O.S. and plan for Prospero to plea terra ignota: uncertainty over whether or not the O.S. assassinations were a crime.

Achilles, transformed from the toy known as the Major into a human by Bridger's suicide, helps world leaders prepare for war, stockpiling food and increasing medical facilities so that the upcoming war is as humane as it can be. Mycroft and Saladin even recruit black market traders to keep supplies flowing to civilians if mainstream channels fail.

At a second emergency session of the Universal Free Alliance Senate, urgent matters are chaotically negotiated:

- Su-Hyeon Ancelet-Kosala is confirmed as official Censor.
- The Sensayers' Conclave is ordered to address the global theological crisis caused by J.E.D.D. Mason's resurrection.
- Lorelai "Cookie" Cook re-proposes the Eighth "Black" Law, banning the development of set-sets and other brainwashing practices like those at Madame's. It is deferred to the next session.
- The Blacklaws call for Sniper's death, but the motion is deferred to the next session.
- The Deputy Commissioner General asks whether the Court should accept or reject Ockham Prospero Saneer's petition for a terra ignota trial.
  - During the debate, Humanist hero-Senator Aesop Quarriman pins a bull's eye symbol to her chest as though to say, if killing me would help the planet, do it.

Achilles, watching with Mycroft and the Servicers, notes that the bull's eye symbol marks the moment when sides in the conflict take clear shape. Over a hundred thousand Servicers choose to swear loyalty to Achilles and begin military training as Myrmidons.

The next day, Julia Doria-Pamphili and J.E.D.D. Mason go to the Sensayers' Conclave. A sensayer attempts to kill J.E.D.D. Mason but is prevented by Utopians wearing Apollo's Delian sun symbol, signaling their readiness for conflict. Dominic and Madame kidnap Mycroft to lure Sniper. An unknown assailant attempts to kill Mycroft. Sniper and Tully rescue him. The war almost breaks out when all Humanists are indicted on O.S.-related charges. J.E.D.D. Mason and Sniper negotiate to cool things down and give both sides more time to prepare and reduce the danger of the war to come.

Cornel MASON and King Isabel of Spain come to conflict over J.E.D.D. Mason's possible succession to Europe's monarchy. The Cousins and Greenpeace faction of the Mitsubishi form an alliance to lessen war's impact. Dominic and Cornel MASON negotiate to end the Mitsubishi strike, kill the set-set ban, and pass the Blacklaw motion to declare Sniper an enemy of the Alliance (though this immediately gets held up in court).

=== May ===
J.E.D.D Mason is invited to Hobbestown to discuss whether he can still serve as a Hiveless Tribune. While there, news breaks that someone has broken into the Masonic Sanctum Sanctorum. The thieves broadcast that J.E.D.D. Mason is the heir to the Empire and also steal the top-secret Masonic Oath of Office. Cornel MASON threatens to go to war right then, but is talked into waiting.

J.E.D.D. Mason, Spain, Madame, Mycroft, Felix, Dominic, Carlyle (now a despairing Dominican Blacklaw), and Achilles go to the Vatican Reservation to get permission for Madame to marry the King and to discern J.E.D.D.'s next action.

J.E.D.D. Mason goes back to the Rostra in Romanova and declares that as his enemies predicted, he intends to take over and re-make global system to build a version that does not need the O.S. assassinations to maintain peace. However, he proposes that all sides wait until the end of the forthcoming Olympic Games, as was the tradition in Ancient Greece. A statement attributed to Sniper agrees.

J.E.D.D. Mason, Mycroft, and Achilles meet Aesop and Papa during a visit to Antarctica's capital Esperanza City. Throughout the visit, Mycroft receives calls from leaders both alive and dead. The group meets with Lesley, disguised and ghostwriting as Sniper because it has been missing since it and Tully rescued Mycroft. Lesley gets J.E.D.D. Mason to agree to search for and free Sniper, because if it does not compete in the Olympics it would break the truce.

Back at Madame's nunnery in Burgos, J.E.D.D. Mason demands the Cousins' unconditional surrender, refuses Dominic's on behalf of the Mitsubishi, and makes a temporary alliance with Cornel MASON. Achilles makes a permanent alliance with MASON. The Cousins, Europeans, Mitsubishi, and Humanists submit their proposals for government reform (or lack thereof) to the Alliance Senate.

=== June ===
Throughout April, May, and June Martin Guildbreaker endeavors to deduce and trap Mycroft's second attacker, whom he believes may also be Sniper's kidnapper.

Mycroft and Achilles separately visit Thisbe in prison. Ockham Prospero Saneer's terra ignota trial begins. Judges recommend that no charges should be brought against Prospero or Humanist Hive leader(s), homicide charges should be brought against Mitsubishi and European Hive leaders, and the Alliance Senate should figure out the limits of lethal force one Hive can use against another. Though Prospero goes free, Papa immediately arrests him for concealing and aiding the murders Thisbe committed against her lovers.

=== August and September ===
The Hive and Hiveless leaders, sans Madame, are called to Romanova by the Utopians. Faust mentions that Cornel and Achilles are having an affair. The Utopians, represented by Huxley Mojave, announce that in order to prevent the destruction of the planet, they have destroyed all facilities capable of creating Harbingers, weapons capable of great destruction, including viral laboratories and nuclear facilities. They have also kidnapped all people with the knowledge of how to create them, except Cato Weeksbooth. As this affects all other Hives, they offer reparations in the form of assets and intellectual property. Furthermore, they give the Hives the means to spy on each other to ensure that no further Harbingers are created. They know this will turn the Hives against them, but judge the risk worth saving all life on Earth.

All begin racing to capture Cato at Klamath Marsh Secure Hospital. Martin tries to set another trap with Mycroft as bait, but is double-crossed. The assailant is revealed to be a surviving Merion Kraye/Casimir Perry, assisted by Croucher.

Sniper is returned days before the Olympics. It seems traumatized but does not reveal where it had been for four months. During the Olympic Opening Ceremonies, J.E.D.D. Mason completely lowers his defenses but Sniper declines to attack him.

A war ceremony is held at the Temple of Janus in Romanova. Immediately, the Utopian undersea city Atlantis is destroyed and thousands killed. During the rescue efforts, Mycroft's tracker indicates his death (though a note in the text reveals otherwise), necessitating the Ninth Anonymous' narration of the final chapter. The novel ends with the world officially at war.

== Characters ==
These are characters who figure significantly in this novel. For a full list of the entire quartet's characters, see the main article for Terra Ignota.

The ◎ symbol is used to denote Hiveguard. The Ⓥ symbol is used to denote Remakers.

- Ⓥ Mycroft Canner: a brilliant polymath and infamous convicted criminal. He serves his sentence as a Servicer, works for many of the most powerful world leaders, and secretly protects Bridger. He is thin and stooped, with curly overgrown hair, reconstructed limbs, distinctive scars, and slightly dark skin. Wears a round, shapeless hat. Thirty-one years old. Of Greek descent.
- Bridger: a 13-year-old boy who can "miracle" toys or representational objects to become real. Fair skin with blondish brown hair, very beautiful.
- Ⓥ The Major a.k.a. Achilles Mojave: the leader of toy soldiers brought to life by Bridger.
  - Lieutenant Aimer a.k.a. Patroclus: the Major's lieutenant and second in command of the toy soldiers.
  - Croucher: a toy soldier who consistently disagrees and questions those around him.
  - Other toy soldiers: Private Pointer, Looker, Crawler, Medic, Stander Yellow, Stander Green, Nogun, and Nostand.
- Mommadoll: an animated doll who cooks and cares for Bridger and the soldiers.

=== Cousins Hive ===
- Ⓥ Carlyle Foster-Kraye de la Trémouïlle: a sensayer (spiritual counselor). The illegitimate child of Danaë and Casimir Perry/Marion Kraye. Blonde and gaunt, thirty-one years old, of European descent. A male assigned he/him and she/her pronouns in different periods of the narrative.
- Bryar Kosala: Chair of the Cousins Hive. Looks tall and imperious, but is deeply kind. Spouse of Vivien Ancelet. Of Indian descent.
- Ⓥ Lorelai "Cookie" Cook: Romanova's Minister of Education. A Nuturist faction leader, opposing the creation of set-sets.
- Darcy Sok: Cousins' Feedback Bureau Chief.

=== European Hive ===
- Isabel Carlos II a.k.a. Spain: King of Spain and former Prime Minister of the European Hive. 59 years old, with nearly black hair. Of Spanish and Chinese descent.
- Casimir Perry/Marion Kraye: the late "second-choice" Prime Minister of the European Hive. A jilted suitor for Danaë who took his revenge by exposing Madame's system.
- ◎ Julia Doria-Pamphili: Head of the Sensayers' Conclave a.k.a. Pontifex Maxima (high priestess). A vocateur specializing in intense one-shot sessions and Mycroft's court appointed sensayer. Expresses a distinctly feminine gender. Of Italian descent.
- Ektor Carlyle 'Papa' Papadelias: Romanovan Commissioner General. Obsessed with the details of Mycroft's case. One hundred and two years old. Of Greek descent. A female assigned 'he' pronouns.

=== Gordian Hive ===
- Felix Faust: Headmaster of the Brillist Institute & Gordian Hive. Seventy-eight years old with a voyeuristic, playful, and sarcastic nature. Of European descent.
- Jin Im-Jin: Speaker of the Universal Free Alliance Senate in Romanova, whom Mycroft calls its Grandpa. Over a hundred years old. Of Korean descent.

=== Hiveless ===
People who, either by choice or by youth, are not part of any Hive.

- Ⓥ Jehovah Epicurus Donatien D'Arouet "J.E.D.D." Mason: Strange but brilliant. A Graylaw Tribune, Familiaris Candidus, and shadow co-leader of every Hive. Wears all black, unfrilly 18th century clothing. Other names/titles used by various Hives include: Jed, Tai-Kun, Xiao Hei Wang, Jagmohan, T.M., Mike, Porphyrogene, '`Aναξ (Anax). Twenty-one years old.
- Ⓥ Dominic Seneschal a.k.a. Canis Domini, Hound of the Lord: A polylaw investigator, sensayer, and J.E.D.D. Mason's abrasive personal valet. A Blacklaw with aggressive, anachronistic style: brown hair in a ribboned ponytail, all-black 18th century European clothes, and a rapier. Leader of the Mitsubishi Hive, though not a member. A female assigned 'he' pronouns; intensely masculine in gender expression.
- Ⓥ Gibraltar Chagatai: J.E.D.D. Mason's chef and housekeeper. A Blacklaw male whom the narrator assigns 'she' pronouns. Of Mongolian descent.
- Ⓥ "Madame" Joyce Faust D'Arouet: J.E.D.D. Mason's biological mother and madam of the Gendered Sex Club.Blacklaw. Wears a large white wig, elaborate gowns, many gems, and doll-like makeup.
- Ⓥ Saladin: Mycroft's ba'sib, lover, and secret accomplice. Thought dead since childhood by all but Mycroft. Wears Apollo Mojave's Utopian coat, full of weapons. Of Greek descent.
- Ⓥ Heloïse D'Arouet: a nun who lives at Madame's, devoted to J.E.D.D. Mason.
- Ⓥ Castel Natekari: The Rumormonger of Hobbestown and Blacklaw Tribune. Baker, retired leader of the Algheni Group. Has black hair and a scar on her left cheek. Of Indian descent.
- Ⓥ Outis: A Servicer, Mycroft's protégé, (fictional) editor of the series, and the Ninth Anonymous (9A). Their crime was murdering the murderers of their ba'sib. Formerly Humanist. Of Greek descent.

=== Humanist Hive ===
- ◎ Ganymede Jean-Louis de la Trémouïlle: former Duke President of the Humanist Hive. Brother of Danaë Marie-Anne de la Trémouïlle. He wears ostentatious 18th century garb to complement his blue eyes and golden shoulder-length hair. Of French descent.
- Ⓥ Vivien Ancelet: President of the Humanist Hive. Formerly Censor and Anonymous. Spouse of Bryar Kosala. Wears slim, shoulder-length dreadlocks. His Humanist boot material resembles old parchment with two layers of script and have Olympic medal and French nation-strat stripes around the soles. Of French and African descent.
- ◎ Aesop Quarriman: The one unelected Humanist Senator chosen annually by heroics. Originator of the bull's eye symbol. Born in Antarctica. Her Humanist boots are fitted polymer for protection and mobility, with many Olympic medal stripes.

==== The Saneer-Weeksbooth bash'house (family) ====
A Humanist bash' which invented the global flying car system and has run it for almost 400 years. Their home and headquarters is in the "Spectacle City" of Cielo de Pájaros, Chile. The current members' parents and predecessors all recently died in a white-water rafting accident.

- ◎ Ockham Prospero Saneer: former leader of the Saneer-Weeksbooth bash'. Quite muscular and knightly, Ockham possesses the extremely rare right to use lethal force. His Humanist boots are steel and leather. Of Indian and possibly Mestizo descent.
- Thisbe Ottila Saneer: another of Bridger's secret protectors and a witch. Besides helping her bash' run the cars, Thisbe is an award-winning "smelltrack" creator for movies. Black-haired, dark-skinned, and confident. Her Humanist boots depict a mountainous brush-pen landscape. Of Indian and possibly Mestizo descent.
- ◎ Ojiro Cardigan Sniper: leader of the Saneer-Weeksbooths, a world-famous athlete, performance artist, model, and professional living doll. Sniper is genderfluid and intersex, assigned 'it' pronouns. Sniper's Humanist boots are leather rimmed with metallic stripes for his Olympic medals. Of Japanese, European, and South American descent.
- Eureka Weeksbooth: a Cartesian set-set who directly interfaces with the car system data via sight, sound, smell, touch, temperature, and taste. Female and assigned 'they' pronouns. Of Chinese descent.
- ◎ Lesley Juniper Sniper Saneer: adopted by the Saneer-Weeksbooths after her own bash' was killed in a flying car accident. A compulsive doodler. Ockham's spouse. Energetic, with curly black hair. Her Humanist boots are made of screen cloth, on which doodles change every day. Of Chinese and African ancestry.

=== Masonic Hive ===
- Ⓥ Cornel Semaphoros MASON: Emperor. Black-haired and bronze-skinned, he wears a square-breasted suit in an exclusive shade of iron gray. His black right sleeve indicates his sole right to order execution. His left foot is prosthetic, the original having been removed during the Masonic Testing of the Successor.
- Ⓥ Mycroft 'Martin' Guildbreaker: A polylaw investigator for Romanova and Minister to J.E.D.D. Mason. A Familiaris Regni, member of Ordo Vitae Dialogorum and Nepos, one of the Emperor's inner circle and absolute subject of his will. Thirty-two years old. Of Persian descent.
- Ⓥ Xiaoliu Guildbreaker: Martin's spouse. Born Mitsubishi, he is the first non-Mason to join the Guildbreaker bash' in generations. The Masonic judge in Ockham Saneer's terra ignota trial. A Familiaris Regni and member of Ordo Vitae Dialogorum. A female assigned 'he' pronouns.
- Charlemagne Guildbreaker Sr.: A well-respected Alliance Senator, whom Mycroft calls the Senate's Grandma. A Familiaris Regni. Martin's grandparent. Bearded. Of Persion descent. A male assigned 'she' pronouns.

=== Mitsubishi Hive ===
- Hotaka Andō Mitsubishi: former Chief Director of the Mitsubishi Executive Directorate, husband of Danaë Marie-Anne de la Trémouïlle. Of Japanese descent.
- Danaë Marie-Anne de la Trémouïlle Mitsubishi: A world famous beauty, incredibly adept at social manipulation and gentle interrogation. Named for the Danaë of Greek mythology. Blonde-haired and blue-eyed. Intensely and expressively feminine. Of French descent.

=== Utopian Hive ===
- Ⓥ Aldrin Bester: A Utopian investigator, wears a coat depicting a space city. A Familiaris Candidus, in the Emperor's inner circle but not subject to his capital powers. Named for astronaut Buzz Aldrin and science fiction author Alfred Bester.
- Ⓥ Voltaire Seldon: A Utopian investigator, wears a coat depicting swampy ruins. A Familiaris Candidus, in the Emperor's inner circle but not subject to his capital powers. Named for philosopher Voltaire and (science) fictional psychohistorian Hari Seldon.
- Mushi Mojave: First entomologist on Mars, wears a coat depicting billions of ants. One of Apollo's ba'pas.
- Huxley Mojave: Mycroft's Utopian guard. Voted to abandon Earth and lost, but was made ambassador anyway. Wears a coat of storms.
- ◎ Tully Mardi/Mojave: The last surviving Mardi, hidden by the Utopians in Luna City on the Moon for the thirteen years since the murder spree. Graylaw Hiveless. Tall and dependent on crutches from growing up in low gravity. Nine years younger than Mycroft.
- Cato Weeksbooth: A brilliant but unstable science teacher and assassin. Volunteer at the Museum of Science and Industry (Chicago), teaching children. Formerly Humanist. Of Chinese descent.

== Reception ==
Publishers Weekly praised the novel's, "wry humor and the ingenious depth." Paul Di Filippo of Locus said readers will, "enjoy the mental and emotional workout." The Washington Book Review praised the book as "Innovative, mesmerizing and full of fun." Barnes & Noble wrote that it is, "transformative, challenging, and engaging."

Kirkus Reviews wrote, "Still intriguing and worth pursuing, but the strain may be beginning to show." Liz Bourke of Tor.com suggested the book is more a philosophical/political exploration couched in novelization, writing, "Ambitious, certainly. Interesting? Yes. Successful? Not, at least, as a novel."

The Will to Battle was a nominee for the 2017 Reviewers' Choice Awards issued by Romantic Times Book Reviews, in the sci-fi novel category.
