= Minnie A. Weeks Pittock =

- Born: August 8, 1862; California
- Died: May 16, 1915 (aged 52); Tucson

Minnie A. Weeks Pittock (August 8, 1862 – May 16, 1915) was an American novelist.

Minnie Amelia Weeks was born on August 8, 1862 in California, the adopted daughter of Reuben Weeks and Clarissa W. Churchill. She married George Washington Pittock and they had one son, Reuben Weeks Pittock.

She published a feminist utopian novel, The God of Civilization: A Romance (1890), under the name M. A. Pittock. Pittock's "God of Civilization" is money and how it controls people, particularly women. The novel is set on the idyllic South Seas island of Kaahlanai, where women choose their mates and men are forced to submit upon pain of death. A group of Americans are shipwrecked on the island and embrace the native customs, including twenty year old Mabel Miller, who (in a depiction that was daring for its time) enters an interracial marriage with Kaahlanai native Akleha, who is described as a "black Apollo." Pittock contrasts Miller with her cousin Lucy Maynard, who is trapped in a miserable society marriage in San Francisco. Mabel returns to the US with Akleha, but eventually they return to Kaahlanai with Lucy and her child.

Another novel by Pittock called Was He A Leper? was announced as forthcoming, but it is not known if this was ever published.

Minnie A. Weeks Pittock died on 16 May 1915 in Tucson, Arizona.
