= Robert Paltock =

English novelist and attorney

Robert Paltock (1697– March 20, 1767) was an English novelist and attorney. His most famous work is The Life and Adventures of Peter Wilkins, a Cornish Man (1751).

== Biography ==
The only son of Thomas Paltock of St James's, Westminster, Paltock was born in 1697. He became an attorney and lived for some time in Clement's Inn. He then moved, before 1759, to Back Lane, Lambeth. He married Anna Skinner, through whom his son, also named Robert, inherited a small property at Ryme Intrinseca, Dorset. There Robert Paltock, who died in London on 20 March 1767, was buried.

== Work ==
The Life and Adventures of Peter Wilkins is somewhat on the same plan as Robinson Crusoe, the special feature being the gawry, or flying woman, whom hero discovered on his island, and married. John W. Cousin, author of A Short Biographical Dictionary of English Literature, was not impressed by it, saying:

"The description of Nosmnbdsgrutt, [sic] the country of the flying people, is a dull imitation of Swift, and much else in the book is tedious."

Paltock's book was admired by Walter Scott, Robert Southey, Samuel Taylor Coleridge, Leigh Hunt and Charles Lamb. The book was reprinted several times, notably with an introduction by A. H. Bullen in 1884. It was translated into French (1763) and into German (1767).
