= Anton Francesco Doni =

Italian author, painter, musician & printer (1513–1574)

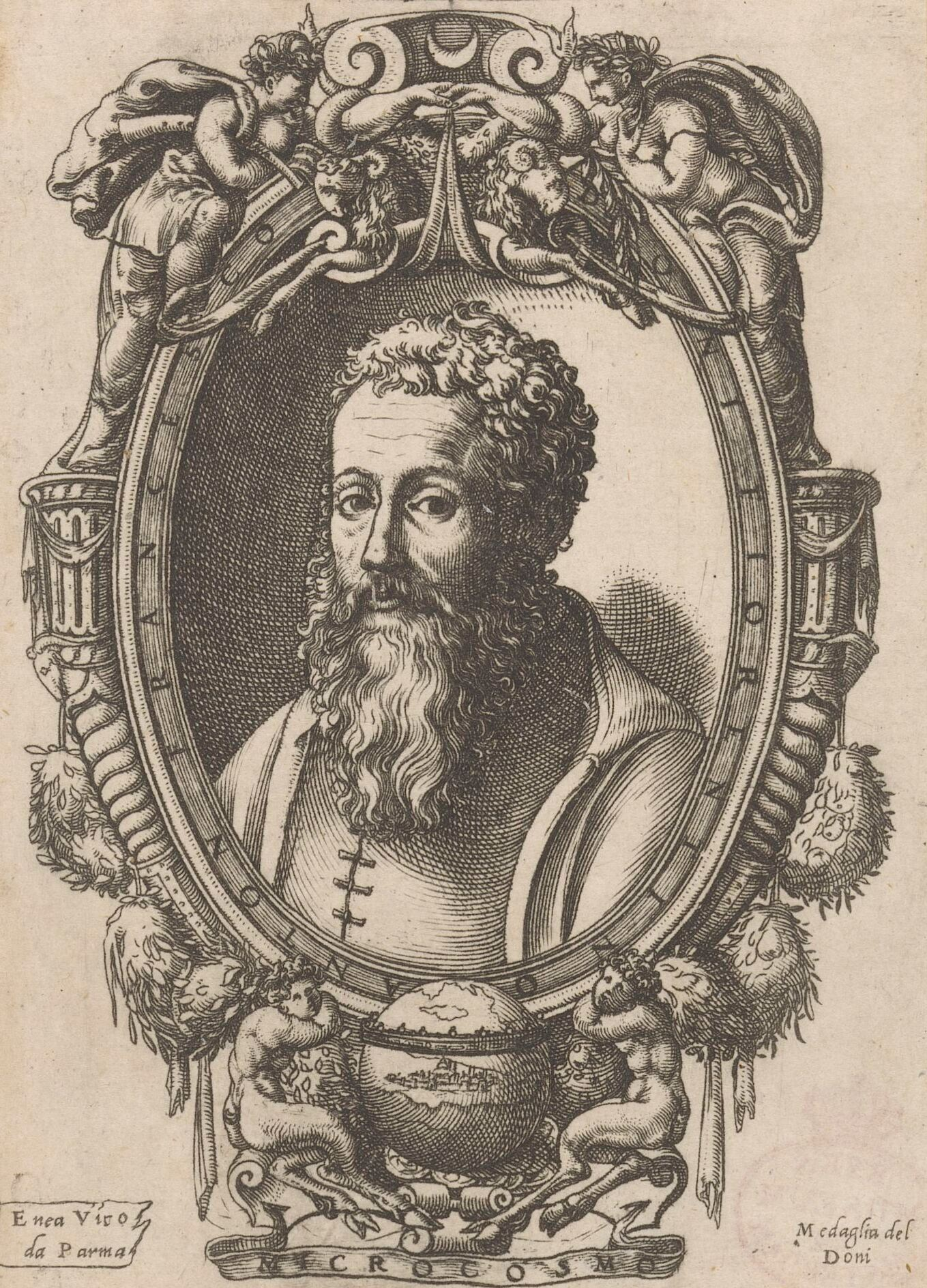
Engraved portrait of Anton Francesco Doni by Enea Vico

Anton Francesco Doni (1513 – 1574) was an Italian author, painter, musician, and printer active during the Renaissance. Doni published at least two bibliographical works: La Libraria in 1550 and La seconda libraria the following year. For this, he is considered the first Italian bibliographer. Doni's own books included Filosofia morale, Marmi, I Mondi e Inferni, and Zucca. In I Mondi Doni outlined several fictional worlds, including a utopian one: Il mondo savio e pazzo.

Doni was born in 1513 in Florence. His family was poor, and he became a member of the Servite Order at a young age. He had left the order by 1540, and joined the Accademia Ortolana at Piacenza. From 1544–1547, Doni again lived in Florence, and from 1548–1554 he lived in Venice. While in Venice he wrote most of his major works. Doni eventually retired in nearby Monselice. He died there in 1574.
