= Terra Ignota =

Science fiction novel series by Ada Palmer

- Too Like the Lightning (2016); Seven Surrenders (2017); The Will to Battle (2017); Perhaps the Stars (2021)
- Author: Ada Palmer
- Country: United States
- Language: English
- Genre: Science fiction, speculative fiction
- Publisher: Tor Books
- No. of books: 4

Terra Ignota is a quartet of science fiction and philosophical novels by the American author Ada Palmer. The series consists of Too Like the Lightning (2016), Seven Surrenders (2017), The Will to Battle (2017), and Perhaps the Stars (2021). After three centuries of a global near-utopia, a minor crime and a miracle child begin to unravel the social system and lead the world to technologically advanced total war. The first three books cover the events leading up to the war and the final book covers the war itself. The novels have won several awards, including a 2017 Compton Crook Award. The first novel was a finalist for the 2017 Hugo Award for Best Novel, and the series as a whole was a finalist for the 2022 Hugo Award for Best Series.

== Setting ==
Set in the year 2454, the Earth of Terra Ignota has seen several centuries of near-total peace and prosperity. Technology is very advanced. Food can be synthesized. The workweek is 20 hours, but vocateurs, or vokers, voluntarily work much more because they love what they do. Everyone is publicly gender neutral, using they/them pronouns. Families are no longer nuclear, but are organized into co-housing collectives called bash'houses. Religion is legally restricted to private counseling relationships or sanctuary reservations. Surveillance is universal; individuals are equipped with personal tracker devices which allow for telecommunication and record a person's whereabouts (as the name suggests), but these can be switched off. Criminals are sentenced to indentured servitude to repay their debt to society; there is no death penalty. This peace and plenty is delicately maintained by the relationships among a small cadre of world leaders.

However, there are still tensions among political groups, such as distribution of land, citizens, and income. The question of "set-sets", people whose nervous systems have been rewired to interface with computers, has caused riots in the recent past. Nurturists are people who believe that set-set creation is cruel and should be banned, since they are cultivated as non-consenting children and are not able to change, grow, or interface normally with life.

=== Hives ===
Following the invention of flying cars and a series of religious wars known as the Church Wars, the 22nd century saw the end of the geographic nation state. Replacing this was a series of Universal Laws and a group of Hives, non-geographical nations with voluntary citizenship. Each Hive has its own legal system, government, language, manner of dress, and capital city. By the year 2454, there are seven Hives, as well as three groups of Hiveless. All minors are Graylaw Hiveless until they pass their Adult Competency Exam and declare an allegiance. Bash'houses can include people from multiple Hives or all from the same Hive.

Group	Capital City	Hive Language	Governmental Structure	Notes
The Humanists	Buenos Aires	Spanish	Flexible-Constitution Democracy	Power is proportional to the amount of the vote received. For example, in times of crisis, power concentrates in a president, who might have more than half the voting power, whereas in more stable times it might be spread among a ruling council. Humanists believe in the power of individual achievement, and were formed by the merger of the sport-dedicated Olympic Hive and theater-dedicated World Stage. Humanists wear individualised boots, whose soles can imprint their individual signature on the ground when they step. Colors: Rainbow.
The Cousins	Casablanca	English	Board of Trustees and Suggestion Box	Originally an international group of volunteers who provided welcoming accommodations to travelers, the Cousins continue to be a community of good Samaritans, their chair being responsible for the Servicer program, and their laws banning the use of recreational drugs and prostitution. Most are Nurturists who oppose the creation of set-sets. The poorest of the Hives. Cousins wear a wrap. Mycroft assigns all Cousins except Carlyle 'she' pronouns. Colors: Blue and white.
Masonic Empire	Alexandria	Masonic neo-Latin	Nonhereditary absolute monarchy	Legend says that the Masonic Empire is descended from Masonic lodges, and the air of mystery gives the Imperium an aura of strength. The successor is kept absolutely secret as is the Oath of Office. Each Emperor can add or change three words of the Oath during their reign. Masons wear suits, frequently with different coloured arms or armbands to symbolise status.
Gordian	Ingolstadt	German	Brain Bash' and corporate Board	The Gordian corporation was named for the sword which cut through the mythical knot. It slowly merged with the Brillist Institute, an academic institution founded by revolutionary psychologist Adolf Richter Brill. The leadership of Gordian is chosen by the institute. Gordians wear sweaters with patterns that indicate their personality traits. Colors: Black, red, gold.
Europe	Brussels	French	National Parliamentary Democracy	The EU of the series represents those who still value ethnic/national identity, even beyond the European continent. Colors: Blue and gold.
Mitsubishi	Tōgenkyō (in Indonesia)	None (Japanese)	Shareholder Democracy (Corporate Timocracy)	Mitsubishi members value land ownership, and are allocated additional shares based on ownership of land, apartments, or factories. The Greenpeace Hive controlled most of the world's wild areas before their merger with Mitsubishi. Indonesia was chosen as the location of the capital as a compromise between the Hive's three major nation-strats, Japan, Korea, and China. Mitsubishis wear clothing that changes with the season. Colors: Red, white, green.
Utopia	Luna City (on the Moon)	None (English/U-speak)	Overlapping "Constellations" of working groups/teams	Full of genius vocateurs who invent things constantly, Utopia is the richest of the Hives. Utopians wear coats and visors of Griffincloth, a digital material that is programmed to display an alternative view of the world behind it based on the interests of the wearer; for example, as though the surroundings were a space station. When a Utopian dies every Utopian coat turns to static for as many seconds as the dead lost years.

==== The Universal Free Alliance Senate ====
All the Hives and Hiveless participate in the global Universal Free Alliance Senate, headquartered in the world capital of Romanova. A large section of its Universal Law Code is presented in chapter five of The Will To Battle. The Senate is composed of two hundred Senators, including representatives from the Hiveless (who can veto) and Minors (who can speak but not vote).

The Senate can send Orders to Alliance departments including the court, the Sensayers' Conclave, the Censor's Office, the Commissioner General and their police, the Housing Board, and the Archive.

==== The Six-Hive Transport System ====
The Six-Hive Transport System is a global network of flying cars, the primary mode of transportation in the series. They are fast enough to circle the globe in less than 4.2 hours, made possible by Cartesian set-sets. Mukta was the prototype car made in 2073 and now resides in the Saneer-Weeksbooth home.

Utopia operates its own car system, separate to the primary one used in the series. The Utopian system is slightly slower than the primary one, but has 100% fewer accidents.

=== Hiveless ===
Since Hive citizenship is voluntary, it must also be possible to be a member of no hive. As such, there are a set of minimum laws that govern all humanity known as the Black Laws. These laws primarily prohibit actions that will result in significant loss of human life or destruction of natural resources, harm a minor, or deprive an individual of the ability to call for help via trackers. Blacklaw Tribunes, the representatives of those without a Hive, have a veto power on any new Black Laws proposed. An additional set of Consensus Laws, known as Gray Laws, reflect reasonable laws frequently recommended to preserve common peace, and ban destructive behaviours such as violence, theft, and exploitation. These laws apply to Minors and those without mental facilities to give informed consent to opt out. Above these is a set of Character Laws known as White Laws, which are used by those that believe that restrictive laws are conducive to moral behaviour, and ban recreational substances and violence, and certain sexual activities. Any adult not a member of a Hive can choose which set of laws they wish to follow and be protected by.

Group	Capital City	Notes
Blacklaw Hiveless	Hobbestown	All humans must follow the eight Universal Laws. Blacklaw Hiveless choose to follow no more. Hobbestown also holds Eight Customs a.k.a. Natural Laws. Further, it's expected that before committing any serious action, a Blacklaw will consult the Rumormonger, who is the best informed person in the city, for advice. Blacklaws wear a black sash.
Graylaw Hiveless		By default, all Minors are Graylaws until they pass their Adult Competency Exam and choose otherwise. Graylaws follow the Black Laws, plus an additional set of "Consensus Laws". Graylaws wear a gray sash.
Whitelaw Hiveless		Whitelaw Hiveless follow all Black Laws and Gray Laws, plus an additional set of "Characters Laws". Whitelaws wear a white sash.

== Style and influence ==
The series is science-fiction, but is written as a history and memoir, with significant sections of philosophical, religious, and political treatise.

Each book starts with an in-fiction internal title page of authorizations, disclaimers and trigger warnings. Palmer explained in an interview that French books of the Ancien Régime period listed the authorities having approved them for censorship purposes, and that such lists provide insights as to the preoccupations and priorities of the society in which they were published.

The majority of the chapters are written in a neo-Enlightenment style, because an influential in-fiction subculture has revived 18th century European clothing, society, and language. Palmer felt there is a particular "emotional experience" when one reads this kind of book, and so adopted the style herself, to further the revival of the eighteenth century in the futuristic world of the series. Palmer has stated that "a number of the major themes come from Enlightenment literature: whether humans have the ability to rationally remake their world for the better, whether gender and morality are artificial or innate, whether Providence is a useful way to understand the world and if so what ethics we can develop to go with it." European philosophers such as Voltaire, Thomas Hobbes, and the Marquis de Sade are significant to the text and its characters. Additional influence can be felt from Greek epics such as The Iliad and The Odyssey, such as extended metaphor and Mycroft's own odyssey in the Mediterranean Sea during Perhaps the Stars.

The primary, and unreliable, narrator of the series is Mycroft Canner, a member of the Servicer program for convicted but paroled criminals. Many of the events are described from Mycroft's point of view, but he also describes some events that he was not directly present for, but which have been relayed to him by others, or which he witnessed through another character's tracker; he also admits to imagining some scenes, in keeping with the intimate narrative voice used throughout the novel. There are occasional "interludes" by other narrators and sections which have been added by later in-universe editors and revisers, such as Sniper's chapter in Seven Surrenders. Beginning in the third book, Mycroft's grasp of reality significantly loosens and he begins to relay dialogue between himself, his imagined reader, and historical or fictional persons.

The novels make frequent direct addresses to a reader, inspired by Jacques the Fatalist from Diderot, which provides the epigraph, and other pieces of eighteenth-century literature. However, the "reader" is not the actual reader of the book, but an imagined in-universe reader whom Mycroft supposes is either his contemporary or someone in his future. Mycroft supplies the responses and objections of said reader. The final two books also feature dialogue with an imagined Thomas Hobbes. Similarly, the narrator makes frequent reference to his act of actually writing the book, and the scrutiny he is under from some other characters, who have apparently acted as editors and censors.

=== Languages ===
Many different languages are spoken throughout the course of the series. Most dialogue is usually rendered in English, but to indicate other languages, and other mediums of communication, various orthographic conventions are used. For the most part, different quotation marks are used for each language. To represent words spoken in Japanese, corner brackets 「 like this 」 are used, while French and Greek speech receive guillemets « like this ». Inverted question and exclamation marks ¡¿like this?! are used to distinguish speech in Spanish. German receives no special punctuation, but text that is translated from German preserves the rules of noun-capitalization of that language, "so the Text looks like this, with all the Nouns capitalized". Masonic Latin, as well as J.E.D.D. Mason's own variety, is often left untranslated, and italicized, but is usually followed by an English translation in brackets, supplied either by Mycroft or 9A. Despite these being the seven languages that Mycroft speaks, occasionally other languages do appear, and they have their own conventions: for instance, when a character speaks Hindi, the full stop is replaced by the Hindi poorna viraam ("।") (U+0964 "Devanagari Danda"). Set-sets communicate only via text seen through trackers, and their dialogue is enclosed in less-than and greater-than signs < like this >, with all text rendered in lower case letters. Other text appearing over trackers is also enclosed in less-than and greater-than signs, but with proper capitalization.

=== Gendered language ===
By default, almost all characters publicly use gender-neutral language, with "they/them" the predominant pronoun used. Mycroft, the primary narrator, finds his world's obsession with gender-neutrality oppressive, so often uses gendered pronouns to refer to other characters, assigning genders based on the characters' personalities and roles, rather than sex characteristics. For instance, Chagatai is a male referred to using 'she' pronouns because of their fierce, lioness-like strength when protecting their nephew from attack. The author has explained that Mycroft, an unreliable narrator, frequently "misuses" gendered pronouns, just as people in real life often make mistakes when using gender-neutral pronouns. Also, in its chapter at the start of Seven Surrenders, Sniper advises the reader to not "trust the gendered pronouns Mycroft gives people, they all come from Madame". Mycroft sometimes varies the gendered pronouns he gives characters. For instance, Carlyle Foster is mostly referred to using 'she' pronouns starting with Seven Surrenders, whereas in the first book Carlyle is referred to with 'he' pronouns.

(This article uses the pronouns that Mycroft uses, changing when he changes.)

=== The titles' origins ===
- The series' title, Terra Ignota, is an alternate form of the archaic topographical term terra incognita (Latin for "unknown land"), once used to denote regions that had not been mapped or documented. Ada Palmer repurposes the term as a new type of international law pleading that is entered by a character during a criminal trial in The Will to Battle.
- The first novel's title, Too Like the Lightning, is taken from Romeo and Juliet (Act II, Scene 2), and was the original inspiration for the series.
- Seven Surrenders describes the events of the book, in which all seven Hives abdicate part of their autonomy to a central character.
- The Will to Battle is taken from Thomas Hobbes' Leviathan, and describes the state of the world during the novel, before fighting actually begins, but "the Will to contend by Battell is sufficiently known."
- Perhaps the Stars, the title of the fourth book in the series, is also the title of the thirteenth chapter of the first novel, which introduced the Utopian hive to the story.

== Plot ==
=== Too Like the Lightning ===
Set in the year 2454, the novel is a fictional memoir written by self-confessed unreliable narrator Mycroft Canner, a brilliant, infamous, and paroled criminal who often serves the world's most powerful leaders. He has been commissioned by several other characters to write the "history" that the series is presented as. Mycroft frequents the Saneer-Weeksbooth home, in which an important stolen document has been planted. The mystery of why and by whom serves as a focal point which draws many different characters, vying for global power and peace, into involvement with the family. Meanwhile, Mycroft tries to protect and conceal a child named Bridger, who has the power to make the unreal real.

=== Seven Surrenders ===
Seven Surrenders describes the final three days of Mycroft's history of the "seven days of transformation", March 27–29, 2454. What began as an oddly obvious minor crime turns out to be a revenge plot thirty years in the making, which threatens to unravel the global system of government. The centuries-long golden era has been propped up by sanctioned assassinations, the death of a few for the good of the many. But as the Hives begin to fall, everyone will have to choose a side in a war with no limits.

=== The Will to Battle ===
The world is experiencing higher tensions, threatening to burst into war at any provocation. Sides are formed: Sniper's Hiveguard and J.E.D.D. Mason's Remakers. All sides agree to a truce until the Olympic Games in August, in order to prepare and reduce the lethality of the war. The novel ends with a ceremony, an attack, and the world newly at war.

=== Perhaps the Stars ===
The series finale covers the entire world war. At the start, trackers are disabled and the car system is no longer available. Violence begins as each faction starts to self-identify with uniforms. Beginning with the new Anonymous in Romanova, the war solidifies between the Remakers (who want the Prince to lead the world) and the Hiveguard (who don't). A sub-war between Brillist Gordian and Utopia for the future of humanity is exposed — should they focus on improving life on Earth or exploring space? Some major figures from the previous books appear and are killed. J.E.D.D. Mason eventually unites the world, ends the war, and builds a new global structure, more balanced and hopefully able to last many more centuries.

== Characters ==
Note: This list is for the entire series. Some characters listed here do not appear in the earlier books. In order to avoid spoilers, this list's plot-relevant details such as Hives or ranks are based on initial appearances of each character. Changes can be found in the character lists for the later books.

- Mycroft Canner – a brilliant polymath and infamous convicted criminal. He serves his sentence as a Servicer, works for many of the most powerful world leaders, and secretly protects Bridger. He is thin and stooped, with curly overgrown hair, reconstructed limbs, distinctive scars, and slightly dark skin. Wears a round, shapeless hat. Thirty-one years old. Of Greek descent.
- Bridger – a 13-year-old boy who can "miracle" toys or representational objects to become real. Bears narrative similarity to the Greek mythical character Asclepius. Fair skin with blondish brown hair, very beautiful.
- The Major a.k.a. Achilles Mojave – the leader of toy soldiers brought to life by Bridger.
- Lieutenant Aimer a.k.a. Patroclus – the Major's lieutenant and second in command of the toy soldiers.
- Croucher – a toy soldier who consistently disagrees and questions those around him.
- Other toy soldiers – Private Pointer, Looker, Crawler, Medic, Stander Yellow, Stander Green, Nogun, and Nostand.
- Mommadoll – an animated doll who cooks and cares for Bridger and the soldiers.

=== Cousins Hive ===
- Carlyle Foster – a sensayer (spiritual counselor). Becomes a spiritual and ethical guide for Bridger. Blonde, blue-eyed, and gaunt, thirty-one years old, of European descent. A male assigned he/him and she/her pronouns in different periods of the narrative.
- Bryar Kosala – Chair of the Cousins Hive. Looks tall and imperious, but is deeply kind. Spouse of Vivien Ancelet. Of Indian descent.
- Lorelai "Cookie" Cook – Romanova's Minister of Education. A Nurturist faction leader, opposing the creation of set-sets. A male assigned 'she' pronouns.
- Darcy Sok – Cousins' Feedback Bureau Chief.

=== European Hive ===
- Isabel Carlos a.k.a. Spain – Former prime minister of the European Hive. King of Spain. 59 years old, with nearly black hair. Of Spanish and Chinese descent.
- Casimir Perry – the unpopular, "second-choice" Prime Minister of the European Hive.
- Leonor Valentín – Crown Prince of Spain and Isabel Carlos' son. Appeared on the false Black Sakura Seven-Ten list. Allied with Perry.
- Julia Doria-Pamphili – Head of the Sensayers' Conclave a.k.a. Pontifex Maxima (high priestess). A vocateur specializing in intense one-shot sessions and Mycroft's court-appointed sensayer. Expresses a distinctly feminine gender. Of Italian descent.
- Ektor Carlyle 'Papa' Papadelias – Romanovan Commissioner General. Obsessed with the details of Mycroft's case. One hundred and two years old. Of Greek descent. A female assigned 'he' pronouns.

=== Gordian Hive ===
- Felix Faust – Headmaster of the Brillist Institute & Gordian Hive. Seventy-eight years old with a voyeuristic, playful, and sarcastic nature. Of European descent.
- Jin Im-Jin – Speaker of the Universal Free Alliance Senate in Romanova, whom Mycroft calls its Grandpa. At least 150 years old. Of Korean descent.

=== Hiveless ===
People who, either by choice or by youth, are not part of any Hive.

- Jehovah Epicurus Donatien D'Arouet "J.E.D.D." Mason – Strange but brilliant. A Graylaw Tribune, Familiaris Candidus, and shadow co-leader of every Hive. Wears all black, unfrilly 18th century clothing. Other names/titles used by various Hives include: Jed, Tai-Kun, Xiao Hei Wang, Jagmohan, T.M., Mike, Porphyrogene, '`Aναξ (Anax). Twenty-one years old.
- Dominic Seneschal a.k.a. Canis Domini, Hound of the Lord – A polylaw investigator, sensayer, and J.E.D.D. Mason's abrasive personal valet. A Blacklaw with aggressive, anachronistic style: brown hair in a ribboned ponytail, all-black 18th century European clothes, and a rapier. A female assigned 'he' pronouns; intensely masculine in gender expression.
- Vivien Ancelet – Appointed for life as the Censor (master of the census) of Romanova and secretly the Anonymous. Spouse of Bryar Kosala. Wears slim, shoulder-length dreadlocks. Of French and African descent.
- The Anonymous a.k.a. the Comte Déguisé – An extremely well-respected political commentator. A role, not an individual, and therefore not a member of any Hive. Elected Vice President of the Humanist Hive by proxy.
- "Madame" Joyce Faust D'Arouet – J.E.D.D. Mason's biological mother and madam of the Gendered Sex Club. Blacklaw. Wears a large white wig, elaborate gowns, many gems, and doll-like makeup.
- Saladin – Mycroft's foster sibling, lover, and secret accomplice. Thought dead since childhood by all but Mycroft. Wears Apollo Mojave's Utopian coat, full of weapons. Of Greek descent.
- Gibraltar Euphrates Chagatai – J.E.D.D. Mason's cook. She is large, strong, and bearded. Blacklaw. Of Mongolian descent.
- Jung Su-Hyeon Ancelet-Kosala – Deputy Censor. Tiny, with black hair. Appeared on the false Black Sakura Seven-Ten list. A female assigned 'he' pronouns to match Vivien Ancelet's. Graylaw. Of Asian descent.
- Heloïse D'Arouet – a nun who lives at Madame's, devoted to J.E.D.D. Mason.
- Castel Natekari – The Rumormonger of Hobbestown and Blacklaw Tribune. Retired leader of the Algheni Group. Has black hair and a scar on her left cheek. Of Indian descent.
- Outis – A Servicer, Mycroft's protégé, (fictional) editor of the series, and the Ninth Anonymous (9A). Their crime was murdering the murderers of their ba'sib. Formerly Humanist. Of Greek descent. Their alias means 'no one' in Greek, a reference to the Odyssey.

=== Humanist Hive ===
- Ganymede Jean-Louis de la Trémouïlle – Duke President of the Humanist Hive. Twin brother of Danaë Marie-Anne de la Trémouïlle. He wears ostentatious 18th century garb to complement his blue eyes and golden shoulder-length hair. He is so beautiful that an entire "Ganymedist" style of art is based on representations of him. Of French descent.
- Brody DeLupa – Proxy Vice President for the Anonymous.
- Aesop Quarriman – The one unelected Humanist Senator chosen annually by heroics. Originator of the bull's eye symbol. Born in Antarctica. Her Humanist boots are fitted polymer for protection and mobility, with many Olympic medal stripes.

==== The Saneer-Weeksbooth bash'house (family) ====
A dynastic Humanist bash' which invented the global flying-car system and has run it for almost 400 years. Their home and headquarters is in the "Spectacle City" of Cielo de Pájaros, Chile. The current members' parents and predecessors all recently died in a white-water rafting accident.

- Ockham Prospero Saneer – the leader of the Saneer-Weeksbooth bash'. Quite muscular and knightly, Ockham possesses the extremely rare right to use lethal force. His Humanist boots are steel and leather. Of Indian and possibly Mestizo descent.
- Thisbe Ottila Saneer – another of Bridger's secret protectors and a witch. Besides helping her bash' run the cars, Thisbe is an award-winning "smelltrack" creator for movies. Black-haired, dark-skinned, and confident. Her Humanist boots depict a mountainous brush-pen landscape. Of Indian and possibly Mestizo descent.
- Ojiro Cardigan Sniper – Second in command of the Saneer-Weeksbooths, a world-famous athlete, performance artist, model, and professional living doll. Sniper is genderfluid and intersex but Mycroft assigns 'he' pronouns to parallel with rivals, Ockham and Ganymede; 'it' pronouns from Seven Surrenders onwards. Sniper's Humanist boots are leather rimmed with metallic stripes representing Olympic medals. Of Japanese, European, and South American descent.
- Lesley Juniper Sniper Saneer – adopted by the Saneer-Weeksbooths after her own bash' was killed in a flying-car accident. A compulsive doodler. Ockham's spouse. Energetic, with curly black hair. Her Humanist boots are made of screen cloth, on which doodles change every day. Of Chinese and African ancestry.
- Cato Weeksbooth – a brilliant but unstable science teacher. Volunteers at the Museum of Science and Industry (Chicago), teaching children. His Humanist boots are made of Utopian Griffincloth and display various internal anatomy of feet. Of Chinese descent.
- Eureka Weeksbooth – a Cartesian set-set who directly interfaces with the car-system data via sight, sound, smell, touch, temperature, and taste. Female and assigned 'they' pronouns. Of Chinese descent.
- Sidney Koons – a Cartesian set-set who directly interfaces with the car system data. Was not born in the Saneer-Weeksbooth bash', but chose it.
- Kat Typer – One of the identical, interchangeable twins who hate each other. Fascinated with the pseudo-scientific spiritualist double-think of the 19th century.
- Robin Typer – One of the identical, interchangeable twins who hate each other. Likes bikes.

=== Masonic Hive ===
- Cornel Semaphoros MASON – Emperor. Black-haired and bronze-skinned, he wears a square-breasted suit in an exclusive shade of iron gray. His black right sleeve indicates his sole right to order execution. His left foot is prosthetic, the original having been removed during the Masonic Testing of the Successor. A male assigned 'he' pronouns.
- Mycroft 'Martin' Guildbreaker – A polylaw investigator for Romanova and Minister to J.E.D.D. Mason. A Familiaris Regni, the first member of Ordo Vitae Dialogorum, and Nepos: one of the Emperor's inner circle and absolute subject of his will. Thirty-two years old. Of Persian descent.
- Xiaoliu Guildbreaker – Martin's spouse. Born Mitsubishi, he is the first non-Mason to join the Guildbreaker bash' in generations. The Masonic judge in Ockham Saneer's terra ignota trial. A Familiaris Regni and member of Ordo Vitae Dialogorum. A female assigned 'he' pronouns.
- Charlemagne Guildbreaker Sr. – A well-respected Alliance Senator, whom Mycroft calls the Senate's Grandma. A Familiaris Regni. Martin's grandparent. Bearded. Of Persian descent. A male assigned 'she' pronouns.

=== Mitsubishi Hive ===
- Hotaka Andō Mitsubishi – Chief Director of the Mitsubishi Executive Directorate, husband of Danaë Marie-Anne de la Trémouïlle. Of Japanese descent.
- Danaë Marie-Anne de la Trémouïlle Mitsubishi – A world-famous beauty, incredibly adept at social manipulation and gentle interrogation. Named for the Danaë of Greek mythology. Twin sister of Ganymede Jean-Louis de la Trémouïlle. Blonde-haired and blue-eyed. Intensely and expressively feminine. Of French descent.
- Tsuneo Sugiyama – Retired reporter for the Black Sakura newspaper; writer of the original Seven-Ten list. Eighty-nine years old. Of Japanese descent.

==== Andō and Danaë's adopted children, unfinished "Oniwaban" set-sets ====
- Harue Mitsubishi
- Hiroaki Mitsubishi – In training with the Cousins' Feedback Bureau, education section. Her sleeveless Brill sweater indicates her skill at math. Of Southeast Asian descent.
- Jun Mitsubishi – Rejected from Brill's Institute. Applied for secretary's post with Gordian's Brain 'bash. In Too Like the Lightning, described as European and freckled. In Seven Surrenders, described as classically Japanese.
- Masami Mitsubishi – An intern at the Black Sakura and writer of the fake stolen Seven-Ten list. Dark-skinned, of Japanese Ainu descent.
- Michi Mitsubishi – Interning with Europe's Parliament.
- Naō Mitsubishi
- Ran Mitsubishi – Attempted to work in Ganymede's offices but was rejected. Of Middle Eastern descent.
- Setsuna Mitsubishi
- Sora Mitsubishi – Personal secretary to the Humanist Praetor in Romanova.
- Toshi Mitsubishi – An analyst with the Censor's office and Graylaw Hiveless. Wears her hair in many small twists and a Japanese nation-strat insignia. Of African and European descent.

=== Utopian Hive ===
- Aldrin Bester – A Utopian investigator. A Familiaris Candidus, in the Emperor's inner circle but not subject to his capital powers. Named for astronaut Buzz Aldrin and science fiction author Alfred Bester. Wears a coat depicting a space city.
- Voltaire Seldon – A Utopian investigator. A Familiaris Candidus, in the Emperor's inner circle but not subject to his capital powers. Named for philosopher Voltaire and fictional psychohistorian Hari Seldon. Wears a coat depicting swampy ruins.
- Mushi Mojave – First entomologist on Mars. One of Apollo's ba'pas. Wears a coat depicting billions of ants.
- Huxley Mojave – Mycroft's Utopian guard. Voted to abandon Earth and lost, but was made ambassador anyway. Wears a coat of storms.

=== Mardi bash' (multi-hive) ===
A bash' of virtuosos obsessed with war, each brilliant in their respective fields. Neighbors of Mycroft's foster bash' and the victims of his murder spree. All but one are deceased at the beginning of the narrative, but are often mentioned.

- Apollo Mojave – Utopian. Named for the Greek god Apollo and the Mojave desert. Golden-haired. Fifteen years older than Mycroft.
- Aeneus Mardi – A Romanovan Senator. Stabbed to death on the Ides of March. Body left on the Altar of Peace.
- Chiasa Mardi – Historian. Mason.
- Geneva Mardi – Senator. Mason raised by Cousins. Crucified.
- Ibis Mardi – Had been in love with Mycroft. Would have become a Cousin. Beaten to death, raped, cooked and eaten alive. One year younger than Mycroft.
- Jie Mardi – Historian. Chinese water torture. Mitsubishi.
- Jules Mardi – Historian. Mason.
- Ken Mardi – A prodigy and would-be swordsman. Kohaku's biological child. Four years younger than Mycroft. Dismembered and left to freeze in the Arctic at thirteen years old.
- Kohaku Mardi – An analyst in the Censor's office. Poisoned, then seppuku'd himself and wrote the point-of-no-return statistics on a wall in their blood. A female assigned 'he' pronouns.
- Laurel Mardi – The golden boy of the bash's younger generation. Dismembered, guillotined, and fed to Mycroft's dog. Three years younger than Mycroft.
- Leigh Mardi – Cousin. Fed to lions in the Great African Reservation.
- Luther Mardigras – Professional party-thrower. Tully's father. Tortured and dismembered over the course of five days and finally burned in a wicker man.
- Mercer Mardi – A Gordian and Brillist Fellow. Tully's mother. Vivisected.
- Makenna Mardi – Historian. Jug-and-funnel water torture.
- Malory Mardi – Humanist.
- Seine Mardi – Apollo's lover. Humanist. Her beauty, romance with Apollo, and death in battle inspired a new subgenre of literature and art.
- Tully Mardi/Mojave – The last surviving Mardi, hidden by the Utopians in Luna City on the Moon for the thirteen years since the murder spree. Graylaw Hiveless. Tall and dependent on crutches from growing up in low gravity. Nine years younger than Mycroft.

== Publication history ==
The worldbuilding process took five years, and was first inspired when Palmer heard the line in Romeo and Juliet that gives the first book its name. Palmer states that the original inspiration was for a structure involving the loss of something precious at the midpoint, and that the outline and worldbuilding grew out of that. The Mycroft character was developed after most of the other central characters, but before the plot.

Palmer found out that she had sold the story to Tor Books at San Antonio Worldcon 2013, five years after she had first submitted it. By the time the first manuscript had been sold, Palmer had written drafts for the second and third.

== Reception ==
NPR qualifies the book as "dense and complex" and the worldbuilding as a "thrilling feat", comparing with Gene Wolfe and Neal Stephenson worlds. The critic describes Too Like the Lightning as "one of the most maddening, majestic, ambitious novels – in any genre – in recent years" but deplores the abrupt ending. The New York Review of Science Fiction compares the narrator with Alex from A Clockwork Orange.

Paul Kincaid in Strange Horizons was disappointed by the gender treatment in Too Like the Lightning, deploring the direct abandon by the narrator, preferring the style in Ancillary Justice. He considered the book concepts to have had the potential to be "one of the most significant works of contemporary science fiction" but fails to "[live] up to its aspirations".

Stuart Conover of Horror Tree felt that "Perhaps the Stars is a fitting conclusion to the Terra Ignota series. It ties up loose ends and provides a satisfying resolution to the story, while also leaving room for the reader to imagine what might happen next."

== Awards ==
Too Like the Lightning was a finalist for the 2017 Hugo Award for Best Novel, and won the 2017 Compton Crook Award for the best first novel in the genre published during the previous year. Seven Surrenders was a finalist for the 2018 Locus Award for Best Science Fiction Novel. The Will to Battle was a nominee for the 2017 Reviewers' Choice Awards issued by Romantic Times Book Reviews, in the sci-fi novel category. The series as a whole was a finalist for the 2022 Hugo Award for Best Series.
