= Marshall Brain =

American author and public speaker (1961–2024)

- Born: Marshall David Brain; May 17, 1961; Santa Monica, California, U.S.
- Died: November 20, 2024 (aged 63); Raleigh, North Carolina, U.S.
- Education: Rensselaer Polytechnic Institute (BS); North Carolina State University (MS)
- Occupations: Businessman, author, public speaker
- Known for: HowStuffWorks; Factory Floor with Marshall Brain
- Website: http://marshallbrain.com/

Marshall David Brain II (May 17, 1961 – November 20, 2024) was an American author, public speaker, futurist, businessman, and academic, who specialized in making complex topics easier to understand for the general public. He was the founder of HowStuffWorks.com and the author of the How Stuff Works book series. He hosted the National Geographic channel's Factory Floor with Marshall Brain and Who Knew? With Marshall Brain.

== Early life and education ==
Marshall Brain was born in Santa Monica, California, where his father designed components for Moon rockets. He received a B.S. in electrical engineering from Rensselaer Polytechnic Institute in 1983, and a M.S in computer science from North Carolina State University.

Marshall taught in the computer science department at North Carolina State University from 1986 to 1992. He also wrote computer programming manuals and ran a software training and consulting company.

== Business career ==
In 1998, Brain founded the website HowStuffWorks.com as a hobby. In 2002, Time magazine described HowStuffWorks.com as "an eclectic encyclopedia that covers everything from torque converters to dieting to DNA." In 2002, Brain sold a part of his related company, How Stuff Works Inc., to The Convex Group, an Atlanta-based investment company owned by former Web MD CEO Jeff Arnold, for an estimated $1 million. Discovery purchased the website for $250 million in 2007 and introduced its television show How Stuff Works in 2008.

In 2008 and 2009, he hosted Factory Floor with Marshall Brain and the Who Knew? With Marshall Brain, both on the National Geographic channel. For these shows, Brain showed viewers how products are designed, tested, and manufactured. Brain says shows like this are popular because "We use this stuff every day and some of it's so interesting. Like the science underneath it, and how people use that science to make the product and other people make it cheap enough for all of us to be able to afford it."

Brain appeared on The Oprah Winfrey Show, Dr. Oz, Good Morning America, CNN, and Modern Marvels.

In addition to his How Stuff Works nonfiction book series, Brain wrote about robotics, transhumanism, and atheism, including his books The Second Intelligent Species: How Humans Will Become as Irrelevant as Cockroaches (2015) and Manna: Two Views of Humanity's Future (2012). Brain maintained that automation and robots will lead to unemployment for humans, such as 1.5 million big-rig truck drivers in the U.S. losing their jobs to self-driving cars, requiring a government guaranteed minimum income.

Brain last lectured at, and was the director of the Engineering Entrepreneurs Program at North Carolina State University. He worked on EcoPRT, a new transportation system, with Dr. Seth Hollar.

== Personal life and death ==
Brain resided in Cary, North Carolina, with his wife Leigh Ann and four children. He was an atheist and ran the website Why Won't God Heal Amputees?. In 2018, he was a speaker during the March for Science, a protest against President Donald Trump.

Brain was found dead in his office at Centennial Campus on November 20, 2024, at the age of 63. His death certificate described the cause of death as suicide. Two and a half hours before his body was discovered, he sent an email to over 30 recipients claiming that he had been forced into retirement at North Carolina State after filing an ethics complaint writing “I have just been through one of the most demoralizing, depressing, humiliating, unjust processes possible with the university.”

== Publications ==
| Books | Publisher | Date | ISBN |
|---|---|---|---|
| Motif Programming: The Essentials... and More | Digital Press | 1992 | ISBN 1-55558-089-0 |
| Using Windows NT: The Essentials for Professionals | Prentice Hall | 1993 | ISBN 0130919772 |
| Win 32 System Services: The Heart of Windows NT | Prentice Hall | 1994 | ISBN 9780130978257 |
| Windows NT Administration: Single Systems to Heterogeneous Networks | Prentice Hall | 1994 | ISBN 0131766945 |
| Visual C++ 2: Developing Professional Applications in Windows 95 and NT Using MFC | Prentice Hall | 1995 | ISBN 0-13-305145-5 |
| Windows Application Design with OLE 2.0: For Windows and Windows NT | Prentice Hall | 1995 | ISBN 0130978175 |
| Developing Professional Applications: For Windows 95 and NT Using MFC, with CD-ROM | Prentice Hall | 1996 | ISBN 9780136163435 |
| Sybase System XI | Prentice Hall | 1996 | ISBN 0134948653 |
| Win 32 System Services (2nd edition) | Prentice Hall | 1996 | ISBN 0133247325 |
| The Teenager's Guide to the Real World: How to Become a Successful Adult | BYG Publishing | 1997 | ISBN 0-9657430-3-9 |
| Microsoft Technology: Networking, Concepts, Tools | Prentice Hall | 1998 | ISBN 0130805580 |
| Understanding COM+ | Prentice Hall | 1998 | ISBN 0130959669 |
| Win 32 System Services: The Heart of Windows 98 and Windows 2000 (3rd Edition) | Prentice Hall | 2000 | ISBN 0130225576 |
| Windows CE 3.0: Application Programming [With CDROM] | Prentice Hall | 2000 | ISBN 9780130255921 |
| How Much Does the Earth Weigh? (Marshall Brain's How Stuff Works) | Wiley | 2001 | ISBN 0-7645-6519-2 |
| Marshall Brain's How Stuff Works | Wiley | 2001 | ISBN 0-7645-6518-4 |
| Marshall Brain's More How Stuff Works | Wiley | 2002 | ISBN 0-7645-6711-X |
| What If...? Intriguing Answers for the Insatiably Curious | Wiley | 2002 | ISBN 0-7645-6657-1 |
| Brain's Sum and Substance Quick Review on Contracts, 7th edition | West | 2006 | ISBN 0314166831 |
| The Science Book: Everything You Need to Know About the World and How It Works | National Geographic | 2008 | ISBN 9781426203374 |
| The Day You Discard Your Body | BYG Publishing Inc. | 2012 | ASIN B00ATF93BS |
| How to Make a Million Dollars | BYG Publishing Inc. | 2012 | ISBN 9780985232122 |
| How to Raise Money from Angel Investors and Venture Capitalists | BYG Publishing Inc. | 2012 | ASIN B00AUJGM3A |
| Manna - Two Views of Humanity's Future | BYG Publishing Inc. | 2012 | ISBN 978-0-9852321-1-5 |
| The Meaning of Life | BYG Publishing Inc. | 2012 | ASIN B007F1PMJ6 |
| 50 Things that Can Kill Your Child and How to Avoid All of Them | BYG Publishing Inc. | 2013 | ASIN B00HNFP816 |
| Robotic Nation & Robotic Freedom | BYG Publishing Inc. | 2013 | ASIN B00HCQLR5M |
| The Engineering Book: From the Catapult to the Curiosity Rover, 250 Milestones in the History of Engineering | Union Square Co | 2015 | ISBN 978-1454908098 |
| How God Works: A Skeptic Questions Belief | Sterling Ethos | 2015 | ISBN 9781454910619 |
| The Second Intelligent Species: How Humans Will Become as Irrelevant as Cockroaches | BYG Publishing Inc. | 2015 | ISBN 978-0-9852321-7-7 |
| How "God" Works: A Logical Inquiry on Faith | Sterling Ethos | 2016 | ISBN 1454910615 |
| The Doomsday Book: The Science Behind Humanity's Greatest Threats | Union Square Co. | 2020 | ISBN 1454939966 |

== Television shows ==
- Factory Floor with Marshall Brain (2008) – Host
- Who Knew? With Marshall Brain (2008) – Host
