= Il mondo savio e pazzo =

Il mondo savio e pazzo (the Wise and Crazy World) is a utopia described by the Italian writer Anton Francesco Doni in the mid-16th century, during the Italian Renaissance. Doni's city is characterized by a lack of wealth inequality, and common holding of property, food, wives, and children.

The world was described by Doni in I mondi, a larger work that describes seven fictional worlds. I Mondi was widely republished in Italy throughout the 16th century. The work was influenced by Thomas More's Utopia, and went on to influence later utopias, such as Tommaso Campanella's The City of the Sun.

== Background and publication ==
Doni proposed Il mondo savio e pazzo (Wise and Crazy World) in a larger work, I mondi, which he wrote while living in Venice, between 1551 and 1552. I Mondi describes seven different fictional worlds; his Wise and Crazy World is the sixth. The work was published in 1552, and republished at least seven times in Italian over the next 60 years, and four times in French (the first in 1578). During this period, the book was more widely republished in Italian than Thomas More's Utopia.

The utopia is sometimes referred to as Doni's "New World", or the "Star City". The work was intended for a fairly broad audience, and used a mix of colloquial and intellectual language.

== Utopia ==
Wild and Crazy World begins with a novella that describes intelligent men (astrologers), who predict that a rainstorm will release vapours that turns the population mad. Instead of helping others, the astrologers build a house which is insulated from the fumes. As they remain in the house, the rest of the population is turned mad. After the rain ceases, the astrologers attempt to take control of wealth. The insane population considers themselves to be sane, and the astrologers mad.

After the novella, a character named "Savio" ("sage" or "wise") discusses a utopian society that they have dreamt of with another character, "Pazzo" (translated as "madman, "fool", or "crazy"). The city that Sage describes is circular, with a massive temple at its centre, and one hundred roads that radiate out from there. The city is carefully structured, with similar crafts geographically near each other. Inhabitants engage in only one craft, wear the same clothes (different colors based on age), and eat the same food. Outside of the city, the whole utopia is dedicated to farming, and the ground is only planted with crops that are suited to its characteristics. There are no individual possessions or marriage, instead wives are held in common and children raised by the society. The city is ruled by a priest, the oldest of 100 in the city.

The work does not provide in-depth discussion of the city's programs for education, governance, religion, or defense, contrasting with many other Renaissance utopias.

The utopia also has high-quality hospitals to treat the sick, characteristic of many Renaissance utopias. Individuals with deformities are thrown into a pit and killed when born. They do not have a large military, considering that no enemies are interested in conquering a city which holds little wealthy.

== Analysis ==
Doni was influenced by Thomas More's Utopia (1516), which was first translated into Italian by 1548, in an edition which Doni himself edited. Other influences include the utopias proposed by Antonio de Guevara (Relox de principes), and Plato (Republic).

While some scholars argue that Savio describes most of the substance of the utopia, and Pazzo is relegated to asking clarifying questions or commentary, more recent commentators have argued that both characters contribute substantively to outlining the city. These scholars argue that this highlights Doni's commentary on sanity and madness, echoing the novella which begins the work.

When Doni wrote his utopia, he was also experiencing a period of economic decline in Italy, as well as political shifts and religious unrest: scholar Paul F. Grendler deemed the moment to have "a mood of crisis." J. C. Davis considered that this climate had left Doni with a "bitter pessimism" about Italian politics. Many aspects of Doni's city, such as the lack of social structure, are critiques of 16th-century European society. Grendler argues that because Doni did not elaborate the practical form of his city, he was writing a "destructive" narrative, aimed primarily at highlighting what he considered problems in Europe.

Doni influenced later Utopian writers, such as Tommaso Campanella (The City of the Sun, 1623).

== Bibliography ==
- Blum, Elisabeth (2016). "A Curious Link Between More and Campanella: Anton Francesco Doni's World of Alternative Worlds". Bruniana & Campanelliana. 22 (1): 85–96. ISSN 1125-3819. JSTOR 26575270.
- Cameron, Allan (1996). "Doni's satirical utopia". Renaissance Studies. 10 (4): 462–473. doi:10.1111/j.1477-4658.1996.tb00366.x. ISSN 0269-1213. JSTOR 24412306.
- Davis, J. C. (1983-07-28). Utopia and the Ideal Society: A Study of English Utopian Writing 1516-1700. Cambridge University Press. ISBN 978-0-521-27551-4.
- Donato, Antonio (2019). "An Introduction to Wise and Crazy World by Anton Francesco Doni". Italian Renaissance Utopias: Doni, Patrizi, and Zuccolo. Palgrave. ISBN 978-3-030-03611-9.
- Grendler, Paul F. (1965). "Utopia in Renaissance Italy: Doni's "New World"". Journal of the History of Ideas. 26 (4): 479–494. doi:10.2307/2708495. ISSN 0022-5037. JSTOR 2708495.
- Nelson, Eric (2006). "Utopia through Italian Eyes: Thomas More and the Critics of Civic Humanism". Renaissance Quarterly. 59 (4): 1029–1057. doi:10.1353/ren.2008.0532. ISSN 0034-4338. JSTOR 10.1353/ren.2008.0532.
