= Ada Palmer =

American novelist

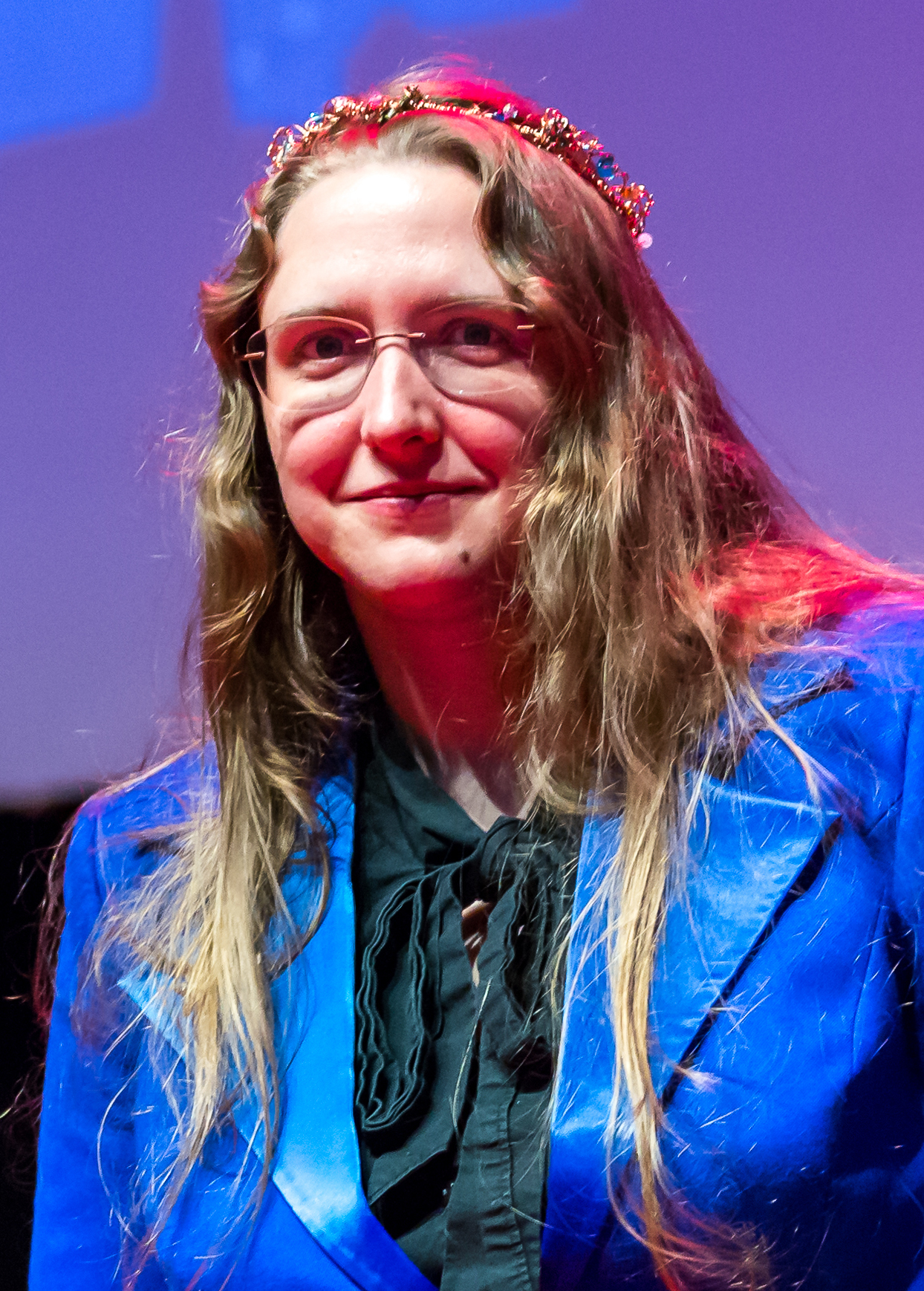
- Palmer in 2017 at the Helsinki Worldcon
- Born: Ada Palmer; June 9, 1981 (age 45); Washington, D.C., U.S.
- Education: Simon's Rock (AA); Bryn Mawr College (BA); Harvard University (MA, PhD)
- Occupations: Novelist; historian; professor
- Writing career
- Period: 2016–present
- Genres: Science fiction, History
- Notable works: Too Like the Lightning; Inventing the Renaissance
- Notable awards: Campbell Award (2017); Hugo Award (2026)
- Website: adapalmer.com

Ada Palmer (born June 9, 1981) is an American historian and writer. She is an associate professor at the University of Chicago and wrote the science fiction series Terra Ignota. The first novel in the series, Too Like the Lightning, was published in May 2016. The work has been well received by critics and was a finalist for the Hugo Award for Best Novel. She received the 2017 John W. Campbell Award for Best New Writer. Her scholarly work Inventing the Renaissance won the 2026 Hugo Award for Best Related Work.

== Early life and education ==
The daughter of computer engineer Douglas Palmer and artist Laura Higgins Palmer, Ada was born in Washington, D.C. but grew up in Annapolis, Maryland, where she attended Key School. She began her undergraduate education at age 15 for two years at Bard College at Simon's Rock, and then transferred to Bryn Mawr College, where she received a Bachelor of Art in history in 2001. She then obtained an M.A. and a Ph.D. in history at Harvard University in 2003 and 2009.

== Academic career ==
Following a stint at Texas A&M University from 2009 to 2014, Palmer began teaching at the University of Chicago. She was an assistant professor at the University of Chicago from 2014 to 2018, and has been an associate professor since 2018.

As a scholar, Palmer researches and teaches about the Renaissance. She teaches a class on the Italian Renaissance, "The Italian Renaissance: Dante, Machiavelli, and the Wars of Popes and Kings", known by the students as "pope class" or "pope LARP". In the class, students reenact the 1492 papal conclave, complete with secret meetings, betrayals, and a final vote conducted in full costume. In an interview, Palmer discussed her experience with the class, suggesting that students have a lot of favorable biases about this period despite its darker underside. She received the Quantrell Award in 2021.

Palmer co-authored The Recovery of Ancient Philosophy in the Renaissance: A Brief Guide with James Hankins in 2008. Her own first book, Reading Lucretius in the Renaissance, was published in 2014. Palmer holds that the Lucretius poem De rerum natura, rediscovered in the Renaissance, could be the first document offering a profane worldview: that is, a worldview in which the universe works without any divine influence. This theory has implications for the development of political science as well as other secular worldviews. Palmer and Hankins also argue that Lucretius's ideas directly influenced Niccolò Machiavelli and utilitarianism, because of the ways in which his theories helped them create an ethics working per se, without any external, godly influence.

Palmer also wrote a book about the Renaissance for general readers, Inventing the Renaissance: The Myth of a Golden Age, published in 2025. It has been described as a work of historiography rather than history, telling not just the history of the Renaissance period, but how "the idea of a Renaissance, a rebirth out of a "dark age" into a "golden age" – has been used, abused, created and demolished, for centuries and centuries, including during the centuries when the Renaissance was actually underway". The book won the 2026 Hugo Award for Best Related Work.

== Literary career ==
Portrait photoshoot at Worldcon 75, Helsinki, before the Hugo Awards – Cixin Liu, Ken Liu, Ada Palmer, Charlie Jane Anders, Jon Oliver and Oliver Johnson

Palmer's first novel, Too Like the Lightning, the first of the Terra Ignota series, was published in 2016, and was a finalist for the 2017 Hugo Awards. It has been described as a rational adjacent book, a work influenced both by science-fiction and historical genres, a fact the author has confirmed. The novel won the 2017 Compton Crook Award for the best first novel in the genre published during the previous year. The second book in the series, Seven Surrenders, was a finalist for the 2018 Locus Award for Best Science Fiction Novel. The third book, The Will to Battle, was a nominee for the 2017 Reviewers' Choice Awards issued by Romantic Times Book Reviews, in the sci-fi novel category. The final book in the series was Perhaps the Stars. The series as a whole was a finalist for the 2022 Hugo Award for Best Series.

Palmer received the 2017 John W. Campbell Award for Best New Writer.

Palmer has announced multiple upcoming projects, including the Hearthfire Saga, a new historical fiction series about Viking mythology, with the first book And Loki In His Prison scheduled to be published in July 2027.

== Personal life ==
Palmer was diagnosed with Crohn's disease and polyendocrine metabolic ovarian syndrome (PMOS) in 2004, and is a disability activist with a particular focus on self-care and invisible disabilities.

Palmer also composes music, including an album centered around a retelling of Norse myths, as part of the group Sassafrass.

== Bibliography ==
=== Fiction ===
==== Terra Ignota ====
- Palmer, Ada (May 10, 2016). Too Like the Lightning. Tor Books. ISBN 978-0765378002.
- —— (March 7, 2017). Seven Surrenders. Tor Books. ISBN 978-0765378026.
- —— (December 19, 2017). The Will to Battle. Tor Books. ISBN 978-0765378040.
- —— (November 2, 2021). Perhaps the Stars. Tor Books. ISBN 978-0765378064.

==== Hearthfire Saga ====
- And Loki in His Prison (scheduled 2027)

=== Non-fiction ===
- ——; Hankins, James (2008). The Recovery of Ancient Philosophy in the Renaissance: A Brief Guide. Firenze: L. S. Olschki. ISBN 9788822257697.
- —— (2014). Reading Lucretius in the Renaissance. Cambridge: Harvard University Press. ISBN 9780674725577.
- —— (2025). Inventing the Renaissance: The Myth of a Golden Age. Chicago: University of Chicago Press. ISBN 9780226837970.
- ——; Walton, Jo (March 2026). Trace Elements: Conversations on Science Fiction & Fantasy. Tor Books. ISBN 9781250372604.

=== Articles ===
- Palmer, Ada (2012). "Reading Lucretius in the Renaissance". Journal of the History of Ideas. 73 (3): 395–416. doi:10.1353/jhi.2012.0023. ISSN 1086-3222.
- Palmer, Ada (October 2017). "Humanist Lives of Classical Philosophers and the Idea of Renaissance Secularization: Virtue, Rhetoric, and the Orthodox Sources of Unbelief". Renaissance Quarterly. 70 (3): 935–976. doi:10.1086/693881. ISSN 0034-4338. S2CID 172036932.
- Palmer, Ada (August 2023). "Pomponio Leto's Lucretius, the Quest for a Classical Technical Lexicon, and the Negative Space of Humanist Latin Knowledge". Erudition and the Republic of Letters. 8 (3): 221–278. doi:10.1163/24055069-08030004. ISSN 2405-5050.
