= Ludovico Zuccolo =

- Born: September 18, 1568; Faenza
- Died: 1630 (aged 61–62); Bologna
- Occupations: Writer, political theorist, lawyer, philosophy professor, courtier, diplomat

Education
- Education: Bologna University

Philosophical work
- Era: Renaissance
- Region: Western philosophy
- Main interests: Political theory, reason of state, utopia
- Notable ideas: Reason of state as conserving a form of government (not necessarily breaking law); attention to utopia

Ludovico Zuccolo (18 September 1568 – 1630) was an Italian writer and political theorist.

== Life ==
Ludovico Zuccolo was born into a noble family in Faenza. He was educated at Bologna University, where he studied philosophy at the Faculty of Arts. He was briefly a lawyer and philosophy professor at Bologna University. From 1608 to 1617 he served as a courtier in Urbino. From 1617 to 1623 he taught philosophy at Bologna and Padua University. In 1623 he accompanied the apostolic nuncio Innocenzo Massimo on a diplomatic mission to Spain. He returned to Italy in 1625, dying in Bologna in 1630.

Zuccolo is remembered as a theorist of reason of state: against Scipione Ammirato, Zuccolo argued that reason of state did not necessarily involve breaking the law, but included any action aiming at conserving a particular form of government. He is also remembered for the attention he gave to utopia in three pieces of writing included in his 1625 Dialogues: 'Aromatario, or the Republic of Utopia'; 'Porto, or the Republic of Evandria'; and 'Belluzzi, or the Happy City'.

== Works ==
- Della ragion di stato, 1621. Republished in Benedetto Croce & Santino Caramella, eds., Politici e moralisti del Seicento, Bari, 1930.
- Discorso delle ragioni del numero del verso italiano. Venice, 1623.
- Discorsi dell'honore, della gloria, della riputatione, del buon concetto. Venice: Presso Marco Ginami, 1623.
- Nobiltà commune et heroica. Venice, 1625.
- Dialoghi di Lodovico Zvccolo ... Ne' qvali con varietà di ervditione si scoprono nuoui, e vaghi pensieri filosofici, morali, e politici.... Venice: Appresso M. Ginammi, 1625.
- Il secolo dell'oro rinascente nella amicizia tra Nicolò Barbarigo e Marco Trevisano. Venice, 1629
- Discorso dello amore verso la patria. Venice, 1631.
