= A Honeymoon in Space =

1901 novel by George Griffith

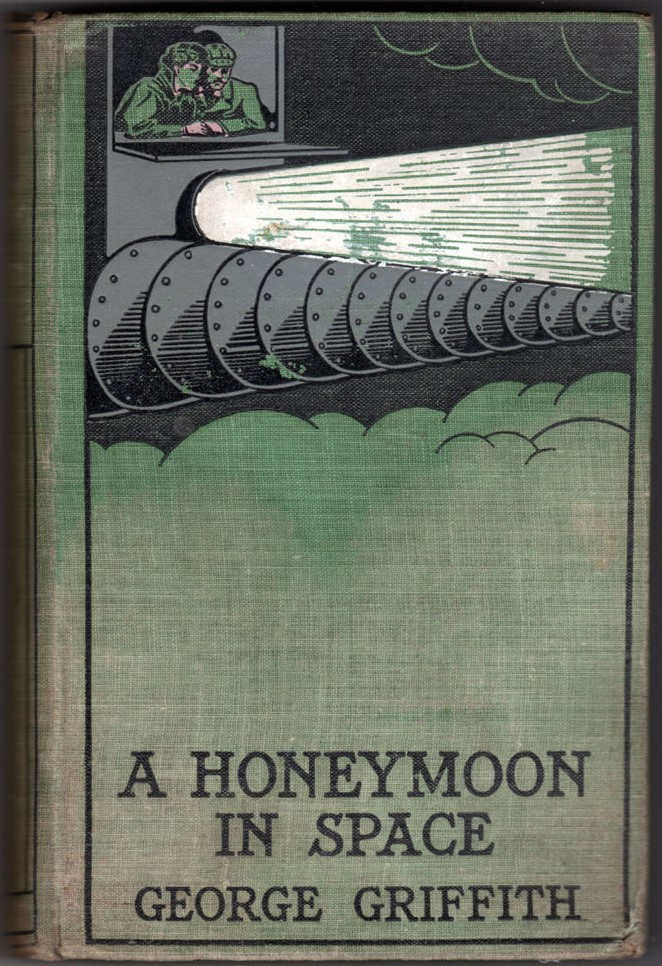
- Cover of the first edition
- Author: George Griffith
- Illustrators: Harold H. Piffard (frontispiece); Stanley L. Wood (illustrations)
- Language: English
- Genre: Science fiction
- Publisher: C. Arthur Pearson Ltd
- Publication date: 1900 (abridged serial); 1901 (complete novel)
- Publication place: United Kingdom

A Honeymoon in Space is a 1901 novel by George Griffith. It was originally serialized in abridged form in Pearson's Magazine in 1900 under the title Stories of Other Worlds. The scientific romance story depicts a tour of the Solar System, a type of story that was in vogue at the time.

Reviewers' opinions on the book's literary quality have varied, while scholars have viewed it as a historically significant work. Important themes identified by critics include Darwinian evolution—which had a significant influence on a large number of works of fiction around the turn of the century—and imperialism.

== Synopsis ==
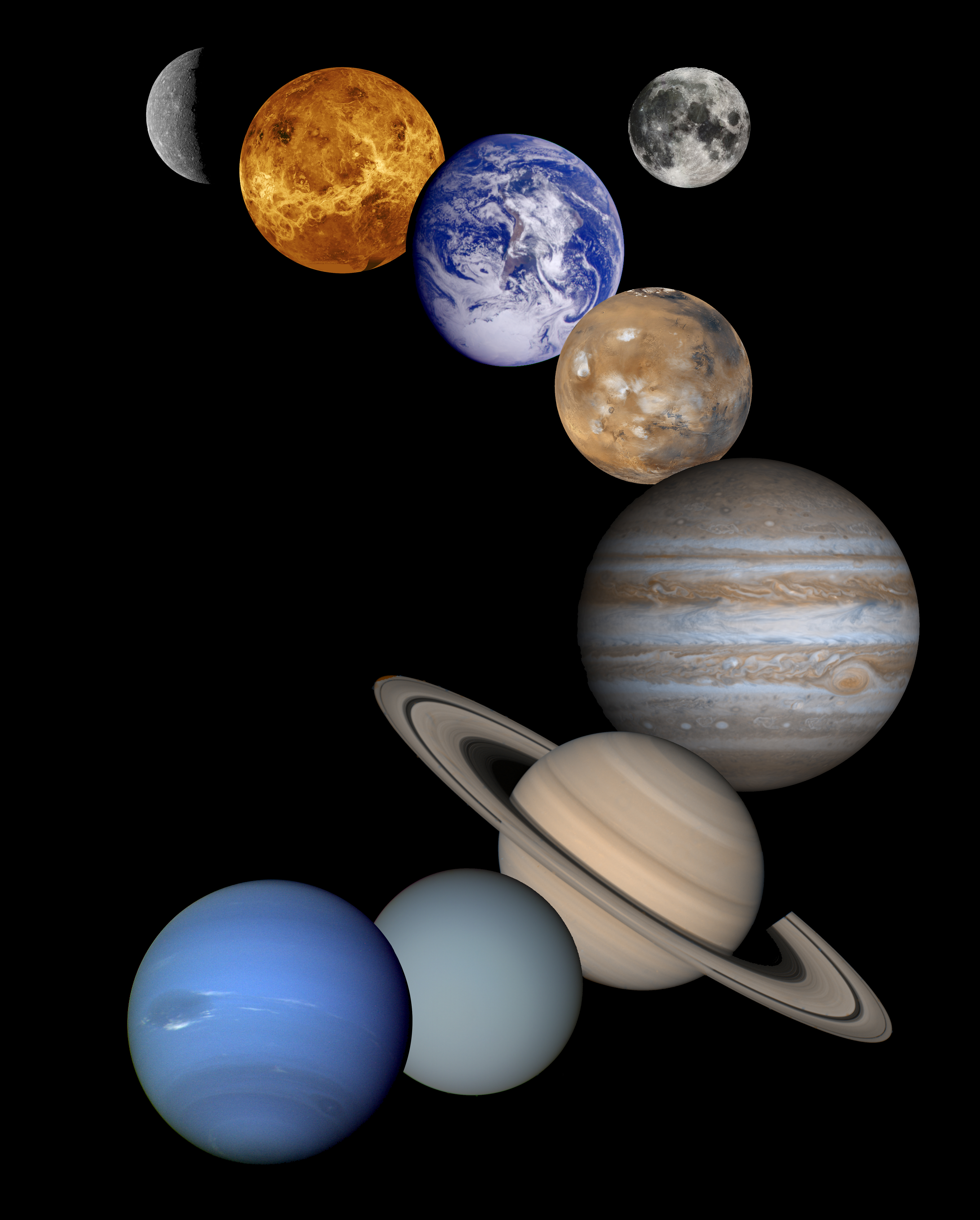
The narrative visits various locations in the Solar System. Clicking on a planet leads to the article about its depiction in fiction.

=== Chapter I–V ===
British aristocrat Rollo Lenox Smeaton Aubrey, the Earl of Redgrave, is in love with an American woman by the name of Lilla Zaidie Rennick, who is engaged to marry another man. Redgrave intercepts the ocean liner carrying Zaidie to her fiancé in England in the Astronef, a spaceship he built from designs made by her deceased father, Dr. Rennick. The Astronef is powered by a form of anti-gravity called the "R. Force", developed by Dr. Rennick with the help of funding from Redgrave. Redgrave lures Zaidie—along with her chaperone—on board the Astronef and then kidnaps her by taking off at great speed to Washington, D.C., where he delivers a top secret alliance treaty from Britain to the president. In delivering the treaty, Redgrave prevents the outbreak of a World War against France and Russia. Zaidie and Redgrave marry on board the Astronef, hovering above the Capitol.

=== Chapter VI–VIII: "A Visit to the Moon" ===
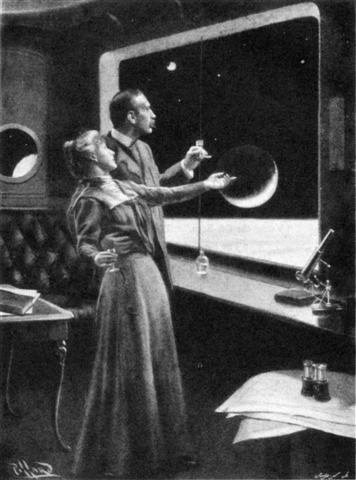
Original frontispiece by Harold H. Piffard

The newlyweds set out on their honeymoon in the Astronef, equipped with spacesuits and accompanied by the ship's pilot Murgatroyd, and make their first stop at the Moon. There, they discover the ruins of a civilization and the skeletons of giants. What little life still exists on the Moon has devolved to a beast-like state and is found only in the deepest craters where small amounts of air and water remain.

=== Chapter IX–XI: "The World of the War God" ===
From the Moon they go to Mars. Upon arrival, they are immediately attacked by an aerial fleet of Martians. After defeating the enemy aircraft, they land and discover that the Martians speak English. The reason, it turns out, is that Martians have evolved in parallel with humans and recognized English as the "most convenient" language. The Martians are giant humanoids, and they have rejected emotions in favour of pure intellect. Zaidie's beauty intrigues one of the Martians whose baser instincts thus begin to re-emerge; disgusted, she shoots him dead in cold blood.

=== Chapter XII–XIII: "A Glimpse of the Sinless Star" ===
The couple's next stop is Venus, which is a paradise populated by angelic beings. The Venusians have progressed to a state of spiritual enlightenment and are entirely without sin. While they do not speak English like the Martians, they use music to communicate, and Zaidie is thus able to make herself understood through singing. Worried that they may be a corrupting influence on the pure and innocent Venusians, Zaidie and Redgrave decide to depart.

=== Chapter XIV–XVI: "The World of the Crystal Cities" ===
Jupiter is found to be a still-developing and uninhabitable volcanic wasteland, and the lovers go to the planet's moon Ganymede instead. There they find a highly advanced civilization living in domed cities to withstand the cold and dry environmental conditions of the moon. The inhabitants of Ganymede are superintelligent and near-divine. They show the Earthlings the moon's evolutionary history on an immensely more advanced version of a cinematograph and join them on an expedition into the Jovian atmosphere.

=== Chapter XVII–XVIII: "In Saturn's Realms" ===
The final destination for the honeymooners is Saturn. The planet is home to a diverse ecosystem of bizarre lifeforms. The atmosphere is so thick that giant airborne jellyfish-like creatures are capable of living in it while roaming for prey. The life found here is more primitive near the equator, and grows increasingly advanced as the voyagers approach the planet's south pole, starting with marine reptiles resembling those of Earth's Mesozoic era and culminating with cavepeople.

=== Chapter XIX–XX: "Homeward Bound" ===
On the journey back to Earth, the Astronef is caught by the gravitational pull of a dark star. In breaking free, the ship's anti-gravity engines cause two such dark stars to collide, resulting in the creation of a new solar system. The travellers make a brief stop on Ceres. As their fuel is running out, they scramble to get back to Earth using Mercury and Venus for gravity assist maneuvers, which brings them dangerously close to the Sun. They eventually arrive safely back home.

== Development ==
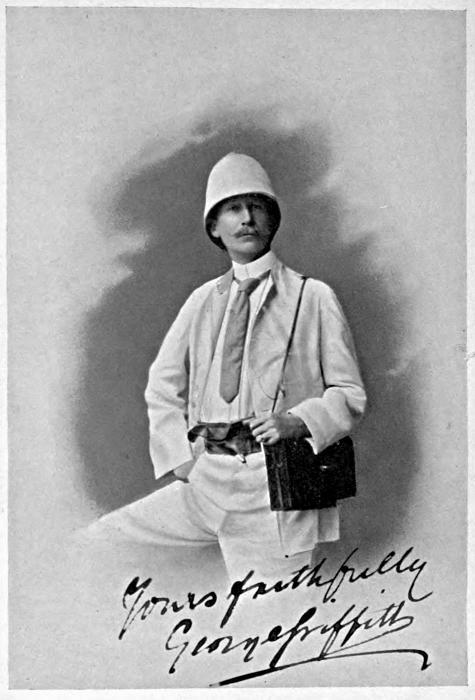
Author George Griffith, seen here on the frontispiece of his 1901 book In an Unknown Prison Land

George Griffith wrote the novel while on a trip to Australia in late 1899. Science fiction historian Sam Moskowitz posits that the idea may have been inspired by Camille Flammarion and Sylvie Pétiaux spending their honeymoon in a balloon in 1874, which Flammarion wrote about. The interplanetary tours in W. S. Lach-Szyrma's 1883 novel Aleriel, or A Voyage to Other Worlds and John Jacob Astor IV's 1894 novel A Journey in Other Worlds are identified by Brian Stableford as other likely influences. A Honeymoon in Space was a return to the scientific romance genre that Griffith had worked on earlier in his writing career (for instance the 1893 novel The Angel of the Revolution), having spent the preceding years mostly writing works in other genres.

== Publication history ==
The narrative was first published as an abridged six-part-serial in Pearson's Magazine under the title Stories of Other Worlds in 1900. It was accompanied by a total of 25 illustrations by Stanley L. Wood. The six instalments were:

- "A Visit to the Moon" (January 1900)
- "The World of the War God" (February 1900)
- "A Glimpse of the Sinless Star" (March 1900)
- "The World of the Crystal Cities" (April 1900)
- "In Saturn's Realms" (May 1900)
- "Homeward Bound" (July 1900) (Note: Intended for June, but delayed one month due to a plague outbreak. The June 1900 issue of Pearson's Magazine bore a note from the editor reading "We regret that we are unable to publish this month the last instalment of these stories. Mr. Griffith was despatched on a special commission to New Caledonia where he has been delayed for some months by an outbreak of the plague and, in consequence, has been unable to forward the manuscript in time for publication.")

These stories were later assembled alongside additional material that had been cut for publication in Pearson's Magazine—roughly a quarter of the total length of the work, consisting of the earliest portion of the story—and published in novel form as A Honeymoon in Space in 1901. The book had seven illustrations by Wood and a frontispiece by Harold H. Piffard.

The magazine version was reprinted in the anthology Worlds Apart: An Anthology of Interplanetary Fiction in 1972 and the novel version was republished in 1975. In the year 2000, the abridged magazine version and the complete novel version were combined in a single volume and published under the title Stories of Other Worlds and A Honeymoon in Space.

== Reception ==
Critical opinions on the book's quality have varied. Moskowitz, in the 1976 book Strange Horizons: The Spectrum of Science Fiction, describes the novel as one of Griffith's most engaging. Stableford, in the 1985 book Scientific Romance in Britain, 1890–1950, opines that "it is an absurd conglomerate of a book, whose silliness is accentuated by a lack of literary skill, but it has an undeniable panache". E. F. Bleiler, in the 1990 reference work Science-Fiction: The Early Years, calls Griffith "historically important, but a bad writer" and dismisses the story as infantile. Don D'Ammassa, in his 2005 Encyclopedia of Science Fiction, calls the book "a kitchen sink space adventure whose scientific basis was unsound even for its time", while acknowledging that he nevertheless found the depictions of the Martians and Venusians interesting. In a 2005 review, Robert Reginald and Douglas Menville write that "the book's portrayal of alien civilizations is quite compelling".

== Analysis ==
=== Place in science fiction history ===
No generalization in terms of specific influences seems adequate or significant; rather, one may judge Griffith to exemplify the often conflicting attitudes with which the popular imagination tried to comprehend the universe and technology that had already destroyed the old orders but had not yet established a satisfying new basis for the twentieth century.

— Neil Barron, Anatomy of Wonder: A Critical Guide to Science Fiction (1981)

David Langford, writing in The Encyclopedia of Science Fiction, identifies the book as belonging to the tradition of fictional "Grand Tour" journeys traversing the Solar System. Stableford adds that among these stories, A Honeymoon in Space was one of the first where "scientific imagination came to outweigh religious imagination as a source of inspiration". Neil Barron, in the 1981 edition of Anatomy of Wonder: A Critical Guide to Science Fiction, says that the book is historically important inasmuch as it serves as a record of what the other planets were imagined to be like at the time. Moskowitz argues in the introduction to the 1968 anthology Science Fiction by Gaslight that Griffith was ahead of his time in displaying "a rebellion against confinement of ideas", while calling the underlying scientific basis of the book "weak in particulars, but conceptually strong in imparting the scope of science fiction". Stableford comments that inasmuch as little in the story is wholly original to Griffith—aspects being variously traceable to earlier fiction by authors such as Jules Verne and Lach-Szyrma and scientific speculation by the likes of Flammarion and Herbert Spencer—the story serves as an archetypal example of the scientific romance genre.

The "breathing dresses" may be the first space suits in fiction.

The book is also, says science fiction scholar Gary Westfahl, sometimes considered one of the forerunners of the space opera subgenre of science fiction that flourished in the later era of the science fiction magazines, alongside such works as Garrett P. Serviss' 1898 novel Edison's Conquest of Mars. According to astrophysicist Andrew May, Griffith's "breathing dresses" may be the first space suits in fiction. Robert Godwin finds Griffith's description of the return journey, with the encounter of something similar to a black hole and the use of gravitational slingshot maneuvers, to be ahead of its time and rivalled only by the fiction writings of Russian rocket scientist Konstantin Tsiolkovsky. The Historical Dictionary of Science Fiction also cites the book (and its component short stories) as providing the first known use of several terms in science fiction, including "earthborn", "homeworld", and "space explorer", as well as "vessel" in the sense of a spaceship.

Science fiction critic Robert Crossley, in the 2011 non-fiction book Imagining Mars: A Literary History, categorizes the book among a group of works from around the turn of the century which he dubs "masculinist fantasies"—works characterized by standing in fundamental opposition to works of feminist science fiction such as the 1893 novel Unveiling a Parallel: A Romance by Alice Ilgenfritz Jones and Ella Robinson Merchant. Crossley comments that while A Honeymoon in Space does not feature any alien princesses for the hero to court—unlike other works in the same tradition—Zaidie serves the same function within the narrative. In Crossley's view, characters embodying this archetype "translate the antifeminist cultural assumptions of the authors into extraterrestrial fantasy".

=== Darwinian evolution ===
One of the central themes of the book is evolution by Charles Darwin's model of natural selection. Redgrave is explicitly a proponent of Darwin's ideas and provides explanations for the creatures they encounter in those terms. The narrative depicts different worlds in various stages of their evolutionary history. Jupiter is primordial and has not yet developed the necessary conditions for life to exist. Saturn exhibits a spectrum of prehistoric lifeforms ranging from ancient reptiles to primitive humanoids. Mars and the Moon are in an earlier and later stage of decline, respectively. According to Barron, the idea of the survival of the fittest combined with the decline and ultimate death of planets constitutes "the cornerstone of [Griffith's] cosmic philosophy". Mars in particular exemplifies the Darwinian theme: the Martians encountered in the story belong to the last surviving race that outcompeted the others as the planet's available resources dwindled. As a result, the Martians that remain are ruthless and unfeeling "over-civilized savages" in possession of highly advanced weaponry but little in the way of humanity. David Darling and Karl Siegfried Guthke both identify Venus and Ganymede as exceptions to the overarching scheme of worlds in various evolutionary stages from early rise to final decline. Life on Venus has progressed not in terms of biology but theology, achieving a higher spiritual state; both authors draw parallels with the later portrayal of Venusians in C. S. Lewis' 1943 novel Perelandra. Life on Ganymede, on the other hand, has overcome the struggle for survival by technological advancement and enabled the cultivation of a society based on rationality and morality.

The influence Darwin's ideas had in this era on fiction in general, and science fiction in particular, can be found in the works of numerous authors besides Griffith. The two most historically significant science fiction examples, according to Guthke, are H. G. Wells' 1897 novel The War of the Worlds and Kurd Lasswitz' 1897 novel Auf Zwei Planeten. Other examples include Astor's A Journey in Other Worlds and Gustavus W. Pope's 1894 novel Journey to Mars. On the topic of Darwinian evolution in A Honeymoon in Space, Stableford suggests that "had Griffith read his Flammarion more attentively, or even his Wells, he might have done much more" instead of mainly representing aliens as variations on humans. The unease many in this time period felt towards the implications of Darwin's teachings as they relate to humanity is reflected in the book: Zaidie objects to Darwin's book title The Descent of Man, saying "We—especially the women—have ascended from that sort of thing, if there is any truth in the story at all; though personally, I must say I prefer dear old Mother Eve", and thereby rejecting the biological explanation for humanity's origin in favour of the Biblical one. Crossley also comments that the influence of Darwin in the extraterrestrial fiction of this era included not only the original concept of Darwinian evolution but also the later notion of social Darwinism.

=== Imperialism ===
[The book] follows the theory that, while peaceful human-type alien races can be accepted as Man's equals (so long as their skin is white), anything ugly or really alien in appearance must be no more than an animal and may therefore be destroyed without compunction. There is no doubt that this idea stems from feelings of white imperialist superiority, an assumption that one has a God-given right to enslave or kill any lesser being than oneself.

— Chris Morgan, The Shape of Futures Past: The Story of Prediction (1980)

According to Barron, Griffith's negative outlook on the future of the Earth is overshadowed by what he calls "jingoistic and racist themes". One of the principal such themes Barron identifies is the position of dominance ascribed to English-speaking people in general and the British in particular. Thomas D. Clareson, in the 1984 reference work Science Fiction in America, 1870s–1930s: An Annotated Bibliography of Primary Sources, likewise writes that "The idea of the supremacy of the Anglo-Saxon people is the cornerstone of [Griffith's] thinking". Crossley comments that the explanation given in the story for the Martians speaking English is an example of the kind of Anglocentric cultural attitudes that had previously been the subject of satire in Wells' The War of the Worlds.

Iwan Rhys Morus, in the 2022 book How the Victorians Took Us to the Moon, writes that the exploration of space in the story reveals the influence of imperialism through the apparent desire to conquer alien worlds. On the subject, Morus notes that the description of the fictional spaceship bears more resemblance to the warships of the era than to either existing airships or the powered flying machines that were being developed at the time. Crossley views the remorseless killing of a Martian by an American heroine as a parallel to the history of US westward expansion that "suggests a smoothly allegorical justification of the removal, by death and relocation, of the indigenous people of the American prairies for the convenience of Anglo-Saxon pioneers". The identification with imperialism is also present in the text itself; Crossley notes that Zaidie's suggestion that the Earthlings take Mars by force, should the Martians not be open to sharing it freely, is labeled "the new American imperialism" by Redgrave.

== See also ==
- A Narrative of the Travels and Adventures of Paul Aermont among the Planets (1873) – another fictional tour of the Solar System
- Space travel in science fiction
