= The Lost Continent: The Story of Atlantis =

1900 novel by C. J. Cutcliffe Hyne

- Cover from the Ballantine paperback edition of 1972.
- Author: C. J. Cutcliffe Hyne
- Language: English
- Genre: Fantasy novel
- Publisher: Hutchinson
- Publication date: 1900
- Publication place: United Kingdom
- Media type: Print (Hardcover)

The Lost Continent: The Story of Atlantis (1899) is a fantasy novel by English author C. J. Cutcliffe Hyne. It is considered one of the classic fictional retellings of the story of the drowning of Atlantis, combining elements of the myth told by Plato with the earlier Greek myth concerning the survival of a universal flood and restoration of the human race by Deucalion.

The novel was published first in serial form in Pearson's Magazine in the issues for July–December 1899, and in hardcover book form by Hutchinson (London) and Harpers (New York) in 1900. There have been several editions since. It was reissued by Ballantine Books as the forty-second volume of the Ballantine Adult Fantasy series during February 1972. Subsequent editions were issued by Oswald Train in 1974 and by Bison Books in 2002. The Ballantine edition includes an introduction by Lin Carter, the Train edition one by L. Sprague de Camp, and the Bison edition one by Harry Turtledove. Armchair Fiction released it as volume 12 of their "Lost World-Lost Race" series in 2017. The novel was also reprinted (slightly abridged) in the magazine Famous Fantastic Mysteries (December 1944), and in the anthology Science Fiction by the Rivals of H. G. Wells by Castle Books in 1979.

== Plot summary ==
The novel uses the common nineteenth-century device of a framing story to set its narrative in context and augment its believability. The story proper was written supposedly by Deucalion, a warrior-priest of ancient Atlantis; the text having been partly destroyed inadvertently by one of its discoverers at the time of its finding, it is not entirely complete. Deucalion's account describes his heroic but ultimately doomed battle to save Atlantis from destruction by its avaricious and selfish empress, Phorenice.

== See also ==
- Atlantis: The Antediluvian World
