= C. J. Cutcliffe Hyne =

English novelist who also wrote as Weatherby Chesney

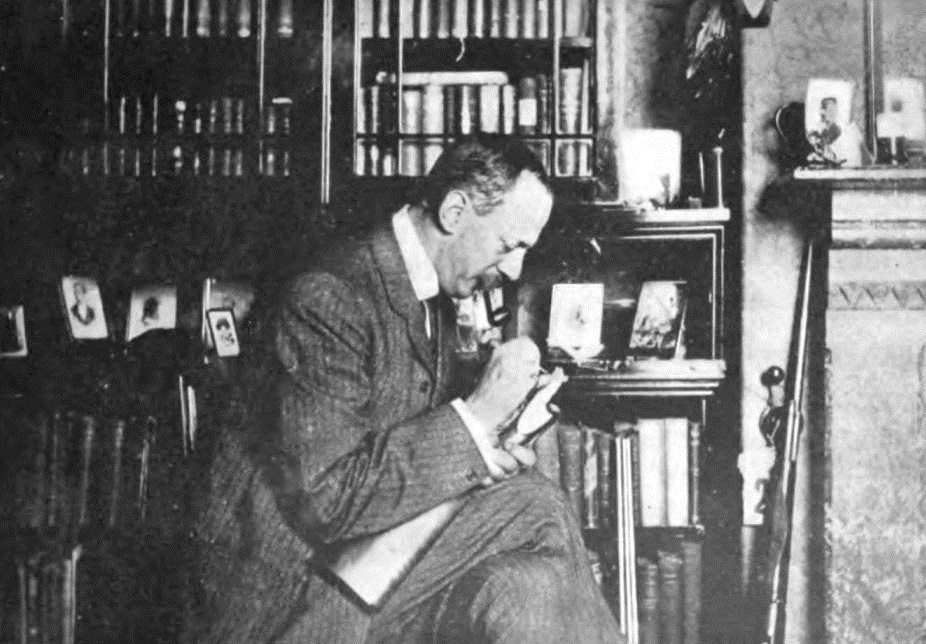
- Born: Charles John Cutcliffe Wright Hyne; November 5, 1866; Bibury, Gloucestershire, England
- Died: March 10, 1944 (aged 77); Kettlewell, West Riding of Yorkshire, England
- Occupation: Novelist
- Spouse: Mary Elizabeth Haggas
- Children: Charles Godfrey Haggas Cutcliffe Hyne; Nancy Mildred Cutcliffe Hyne
- Writing career
- Language: English
- Genre: Fiction

Charles John Cutcliffe Wright Hyne (11 May 1866 – 10 March 1944) was an English novelist who was also known by the pen name Weatherby Chesney. He is perhaps best remembered as the author of The Lost Continent: The Story of Atlantis. He is also remembered for his Captain Kettle stories and for The Recipe for Diamonds.

== Biography ==
Hyne was born 11 May 1866. He was married to Mary Elizabeth Haggas (died 1938). They had a son named Charles Godfrey Haggas Cutcliffe Hyne (1 December 1897 – 21 November 1916), who was wounded in the Battle of the Somme and died from his wounds. They also had a daughter, Nancy Mildred Cutcliffe Hyne (1902–1999).

Captain Kettle first appeared as a side character in the novel Honour of Thieves (1895). His first appearance as a main character was in the short story 'Stealing a President' in vol 1, issue 6 of Pearson's Magazine (1896). This initial short story was followed in 1897 by a series of twelve short stories again in Pearson's Magazine that were later collected and published as Adventures of Captain Kettle. Over the next four years two more sets of twelve stories were published in Pearson's Magazine and subsequently collected as Further Adventures of Captain Kettle ("A master of fortune" in the US) and Captain Kettle K.C.B. respectively.

The character of Captain Kettle was one of action and decision. He is said to be based on a South Shields sea captain, Davey Proffit, whose physical appearance closely matched the descriptions in the books, but Cutcliffe Hyne insisted emphatically that this was not the case. However, the most enduring image of Kettle was created by Stanley L. Wood, who provided the illustrations for Pearson's Magazine; they were reprinted in the first book compilations of the stories. He found 'the exact spit and image of our little sailor, pulling beer behind a bar' in a pub in north London. This is noteworthy because Wood's Captain Kettle bears a striking resemblance (particularly in his stance, the set of the head on the shoulders, his beard and the characteristic gaze) to the novelist Joseph Conrad, also a sailor. Among the people who saw this remarkable similarity was H. G. Wells, whose War of the Worlds appeared in Pearson's in instalments, alternating with the Captain Kettle stories. Conrad met Wells at just this time, read Pearson's, and borrowed whole phrases, key episodes, and images from the Kettle stories for Heart of Darkness. Cutcliffe Hyne would probably have been forgotten but for the American science fiction fans such as Sprague de Camp. They republished The Lost Continent without permission, possible because of the then American copyright law, which led to the republishing of his other stories.

== Bibliography ==
- "Banana Farming in the Canary Islands", The Windsor Magazine – commonly listed as a book

=== Captain Kettle series ===
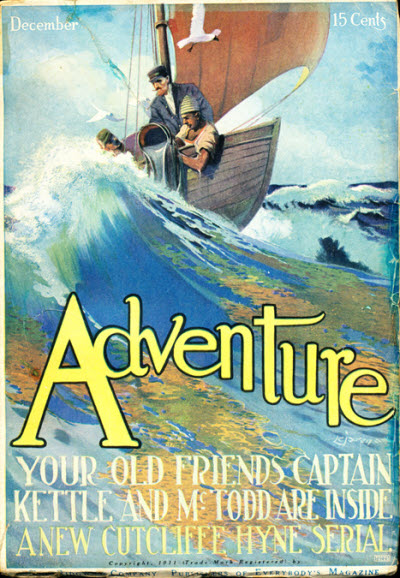
The Marriage of Captain Kettle was serialised in Adventure in 1911–1912

- Honour of Thieves (Chatto and Windus: 1895) (Reprinted as The Little Red Captain (Pearson: 1902)
- Adventures of Captain Kettle (C A Pearson: 1898)
- Further Adventures of Captain Kettle (Pearson: 1899) (aka Master of Fortune (Dillingham: 1901))
- Captain Kettle K.C.B. (The Last Adventure) (Pearson: 1903)
- The Marriage of Captain Kettle (Heinemann: 1912)
- Captain Kettle on the War-Path (Methuen: 1916)
- Captain Kettle's Bit (Hodder and Stoughton: 1918)
- The Rev. Captain Kettle (Harrap: 1925)
- President Kettle (Eveleigh, Nash and Grayson: 1929)
- Mr Kettle, Third Mate (Ward Lock: 1931)
- Captain Kettle, Ambassador (Ward Lock: 1932)
- Ivory Valley (Ward Lock: 1938)

=== Other fiction ===
- Beneath Your Very Boots (Digby and Long: 1889)
- Currie, Curtis & Co., Crammers (Remington: 1890)
- Four Red Nightcaps (Eden, Remington: 1899) (Also published by MacQueen: 1900 as by Weatherby Chesney)
- Stimson's Reef (Blackie: 1891)
- The Matrimonial Mixture (Ward and Downey: 1891)
- The Captured Cruiser, or Two years from land (Blackie: 1892)
- Sandy Carmichael (1892: Sampson Low)
- The New Eden (Longmans: 1892)
- The Recipe for Diamonds (Heinemann: 1893)
- The Wild-Catters: A Tale of the Pennsylvanian Oil-Fields (with H. S. Greig) (Sunday School Union: 1895)
- The Lost Continent: The Story of Atlantis (Hutchinson: 1900)
- The Filibusters (Hutchinson: 1900)
- Prince Rupert the Buccaneer (Methuen: 1901)
- Thompson's Progress (Grant Richards: 1902)
- Mr. Horrocks Purser (Dundee and London: John Long & Co, Ltd: 1902)
- McTodd (Macmillan: 1903)
- Atoms of Empire (Macmillan: 1904)
- Kate Meredith, Financier (Authors and Newspapers Assoc: 1906) (aka Kate Meredith (Cassell: 1907)
- Empire of the World (Everett: 1910), also known as Emperor of the World
- Admiral Teach (Methuen: 1920)
- Ben Watson (Country Life: 1926)
- Abbs, His Story Through Many Ages (Hutchinson: 1929)
- Wishing Smith (Robert Hale: 1939)

=== Short story collections ===
- The Stronger Hand (Tower: 1896)
- The "Paradise" Coal-Boat and Other Tales (Bowden: 1897)
- The Derelict (Lewis, Scribner: 1901) (aka Mr Horrocks, Purser (Methuen: 1902)
- The Trials of Commander McTurk (Murray: 1906) (Short Stories, one with Captain Keetle)
- The Escape Agents (Laurie: 1911)
- Firemen Hot (Methuen: 1914)
- Red Herrings (Methuen: 1918)
- West Highland Spirits (Ward Lock: 1932)
- Absent Friends (Ward Lock: 1933)
- Man's Understanding (Ward Lock: 1933)
- Steamboatmen (Penguin: 1943) (Selected Short Stories)

=== Fiction published under the name Weatherby Chesney ===
- The Adventures of an Engineer (Bowden: 1898) (Short stories)
- The Adventures of a Solicitor (Bowden: 1898) (Short stories)
- The Dilemma of Commander Brett (Bowden: 1899)
- Prince Rupert the Buccaneer (Methuen: 1901)
- John Topp, Pirate (Methuen: 1901)
- The Foundered Galleon (Methuen: 1902)
- The Fate of Capt. Petton (Everett: 1902)
- The Branded Prince (Methuen: 1902)
- The Glass Dagger (New Amsterdam Book Co.: )
- The Baptist Ring (Methuen: 1903)
- The Tragedy of the Great Emerald (Methuen: 1904)
- The Mystery of a Bungalow (Methuen: 1904)
- The Cable-Man (Chatto and Windus: 1907)
- Romance of a Queen (Chatto and Windus: 1908)
- The Claimant (Chatto and Windus: 1908)
- Eighteen Exciting Adventures (James Askew & Son: 1914)

=== Fiction published under the name Nicholson West ===
- The Mysterious Millionaire (Greening: 1906)

=== Nonfiction ===
- Through Arctic Lapland (A & C Black: 1898)
- People and Places as Seen by C. J. Cutcliffe-Hyne (Newnes: 1930)
- But Britains are Slaves (Desmond Harmsworth: 1931)
- My Joyful Life (Hutchinson: 1935)
- Don't You Agree? (Hutchinson: 1936)
