= Alice Ilgenfritz Jones =

American writer

Alice Ilgenfritz Jones (January 9, 1846 – March 5, 1906) was an American author. Born in Ohio, she spent most of her life in Cedar Rapids, Iowa. She wrote travel essays for Lippincott's Monthly Magazine and several novels. The first novel, High-Water Mark, appeared under the pen name "Ferris Jerome" and was a Gothic romance set in a prairie town. Her most notable work is the 1893 feminist utopia Unveiling a Parallel. She wrote it with Ella Robinson Merchant, and they called themselves the "Two Women of the West". Jones also wrote a novel about an enslaved woman who becomes an artist, Beatrice of Bayou Têche, and a historical novel set in the 18th century called The Chevalier de St. Denis. She died during a vacation in Cuba.

== Biography ==
Alice Ilgenfritz was born on January 9, 1846, in Shanesville, Ohio. Her parents were Henry and Anna Ilgenfritz (née Murray). They moved to Clarksville, Iowa, in 1863; her father traded furniture and at some point became mayor. Alice, who lived in Cedar Rapids, Iowa, for most of her life, went to school at the Evansville Seminary in Evansville, Wisconsin.

Under the pen name Ferris Jerome, she wrote the 1879 novel High-Water Mark published by J. B. Lippincott & Co. The title refers to a fictional prairie town where the action takes place, but the book is more like a Gothic romance than a pioneer story. In the following years, she wrote further fiction and also travelogues that were published in Lippincott's Monthly Magazine. She described travels to the lakes of Minnesota and to the Red River of the North. In 1884, she married Hiram Edward Jones, a furniture merchant in Cedar Rapids. Her husband was a widower who had a small daughter.

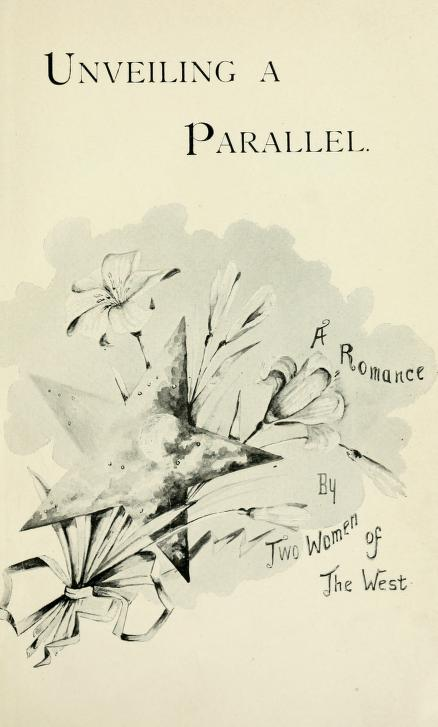
Title page of Unveiling a Parallel, 1893

Alice Jones's next published work was the 1893 utopian science fiction Unveiling a Parallel, written together with Ella Robinson Merchant under the joint pseudonym "Two Women of the West". The book, set on Mars, shows two societies where men and women are equal. Jones's and Merchant's motivation as well as their respective contributions to the book are not known. In 1895, Jones published Beatrice of Bayou Têche, a story about a light-skinned mixed-race enslaved woman who embarks on an artistic career after being freed. Jones knew the New Orleans area and the bayous from personal experience, since she regularly visited her sister in Jennings, Louisiana. Her final novel was The Chevalier de St. Denis, a historical novel set in the 18th century. On March 5, 1906, during a six-week vacation in Cuba with her husband, Jones died from a cerebral hemorrhage. She was buried in Oak Hill Cemetery in Cedar Rapids.

== Reception ==
Jones's 1879 novel High-Water Mark has been described as "the first Iowa novel" by the literary historian Clarence Andrews. (Note: The book is not listed in the "Iowa" chapter of the Dictionary of Midwestern Literature, Volume 2, which lists M. Emilia Rockwell's 1858 Home in the West, a book supposed to encourage migration to the Midwest, as the first novel published in Iowa. Caroline Soule's 1860 The Pet of the Settlement is mentioned as a novel set in Iowa, and Kate Harrington's 1856 Emma Bartlett: Prejudice and Fanaticism by an American Lady as the first novel written by someone living in Iowa.) In 1890, the librarian Theodore S. Parvin included Jones in his list of Iowa authors. The 1893 Unveiling a Parallel was not widely reviewed and was out of print and difficult to obtain for nearly a century. Duangrudi Suksang, a reviewer of the 1991 re-edition described it as a "pioneering feminist work". Another reviewer, Veronica Hollinger, while listing the book as one of a "trilogy of significant works", found that "Jones and Merchant are not particularly sophisticated writers, and it is unlikely that Unveiling a Parallel will displace Herland from its position as the classic early feminist utopia." According to the 2001 re-edition of Beatrice of Bayou Têche, described by reviewer Joan Hall as "long out of print and rarely discussed by literary critics", Jones was "the first white woman to take the intersection of race, gender, and creativity as her primary subject". At the time of publication, both Beatrice and The Chevalier de St. Denis were positively reviewed. One 1895 reviewer stated that the topic of slavery had "seldom been handled more forcefully" than in Beatrice, excepting only Uncle Tom's Cabin. In 1901, Bethel Coopwood, reviewing The Chevalier, found it a "well written historical novel" and "above the average of its kind in the market".

== Works ==
- Jerome, Ferris (1879). High-water-mark. Philadelphia: J. B. Lippincott. hdl:2027/uc2.ark:/13960/t0wp9vd2v.
- Two women of the West (1893). Unveiling a parallel : a romance. Boston: Arena Pub. Co. hdl:2027/dul1.ark:/13960/t2f772s6g.
  - Jones, Alice Ilgenfritz; Merchant, Ella (October 1, 1991). Unveiling a Parallel: A Romance. Syracuse University Press. ISBN 978-0-8156-2538-4.
- Jones, Alice Ilgenfritz (1895). Beatrice of Bayou Têche. Chicago: A. C. McClurg and Company. hdl:2027/njp.32101068970639.
  - Jones, Alice Ilgenfritz (2001). Beatrice of Bayou Têche. Bowling Green, OH : Bowling Green State University Popular Press. ISBN 978-0-87972-832-8.
- Jones, Alice Ilgenfritz (1900). The chevalier de St. Denis. Chicago: A. C. McClurg and Company.

== Sources ==
- Andrews, Clarence A. (1972). A Literary History of Iowa. University of Iowa Press. ISBN 978-1-58729-008-4.
- Andrews, Clarence A. (1979). "A Bibliography of Fiction and Drama, by Women from Iowa and Michigan". The Great Lakes Review. 6 (1): 56–68. doi:10.2307/20172475. ISSN 0360-1846. JSTOR 20172475.
- Coopwood, Bethel (1901). "Book Reviews and Notices". The Quarterly of the Texas State Historical Association. 4 (3): 230–231. ISSN 1948-3317. JSTOR 27784881.
- Hall, Joan Wylie (April 1, 2002). "Beatrice of Bayou Teche (Book)". Arkansas Review: A Journal of Delta Studies. 33 (1): 54–55.
- Hollinger, Veronica (1994). "Utopia, Science, Postmodernism, and Feminism: A Trilogy of Significant Works". Science Fiction Studies. 21 (2): 232–237. ISSN 0091-7729. JSTOR 4240336.
- Kessler, Carol Farley (1990). "Bibliography of Utopian Fiction by United States Women 1836-1988". Utopian Studies. 1 (1): 1–58. ISSN 1045-991X. JSTOR 20718957.
- Kolmerten, Carol A. (October 1, 1991). Introduction. Unveiling a Parallel: A Romance. By Jones, Alice Ilgenfritz; Merchant, Ella. Syracuse University Press. pp. ix–xlv. ISBN 978-0-8156-0259-0.
- Lake, Christina (November 2018). "Eugenics in Late 19th-Century Feminist Utopias". American Journal of Economics and Sociology. 77 (5): 1277–1312. doi:10.1111/ajes.12251. S2CID 149954554.
- Malena, Anne (2021). "Phantom translation in New Orleans". In Lee, Tong King (ed.). The Routledge Handbook of Translation and the City. London: Routledge. pp. 381–393. doi:10.4324/9780429436468-28. ISBN 9780429436468. S2CID 235585286.
- Raine, Kristy Nelson (2016). "Iowa". In Greasley, Philip A. (ed.). Dictionary of Midwestern Literature, Volume 2: Dimensions of the Midwestern Literary Imagination. pp. 364–383. ISBN 978-0253021045.
- Suksang, Duangrudi (1993). "Review of Unveiling a Parallel". Utopian Studies. 4 (1): 143–145. ISSN 1045-991X. JSTOR 20719185.
- Graves Registration Project. Tombstone records of Linn county, Iowa. Works Project Administration.
- "Beatrice of Bayou Teche". The Literary World. 26. Boston: S.R. Crocker: 458. December 14, 1895.
