= Anatomy of Wonder =

Reference book by Neil Barron

Anatomy of Wonder — A Critical Guide to Science Fiction is a reference book by Neil Barron. It covers hundreds of works of science fiction.

== Publication history ==
The book received a total of five editions, each updated and expanded compared to the previous ones:

- Anatomy of Wonder: Science Fiction (1976)
- Anatomy of Wonder: A Critical Guide to Science Fiction: Second Edition (1981)
- Anatomy of Wonder: A Critical Guide to Science Fiction: Third Edition (1987)
- Anatomy of Wonder 4: A Critical Guide to Science Fiction (1995)
- Anatomy of Wonder: A Critical Guide to Science Fiction: Fifth Edition (2004)

== Reception ==
Dave Langford reviewed Anatomy of Wonder for White Dwarf #39, and stated that "The book records hundreds of 'major' SF works from antiquity to 1980, with useful plot summaries [...] and idiosyncratic recommendations for building up a collection of fine SF. A unique reference book, shortlisted for the 1982 Hugo Award, non-fiction category."

The book was nominated for the Hugo Award for Best Related Work for 1982, but lost to Danse Macabre.

== Reviews ==
- Review by Jeff Frane (1981) in Locus, #248 September 1981
- Review by Thomas D. Clareson (1981) in Extrapolation, Winter 1981
- Review by Arthur O. Lewis (1982) in Science Fiction & Fantasy Book Review, #1, January–February 1982
- Review by Tom Staicar (1982) in Amazing Science Fiction Stories, March 1982
- Review by Thomas A. Easton [as by Tom Easton] (1982) in Analog Science Fiction/Science Fact, May 1982
- Review by T. E. D. Klein (1982) in Rod Serling's The Twilight Zone Magazine, August 1982

== See also ==
- The Encyclopedia of Science Fiction
- Encyclopedia of Fantasy
- Historical Dictionary of Science Fiction by Brian Stableford
