= Neil Barron =

American novelist

Richard Neil Barron (23 March 1934 - 5 September 2010) was a science fiction bibliographer and scholar. His training was as a librarian. He is perhaps best known for his book Anatomy of Wonder: A Critical Guide to Science Fiction. He won the Pilgrim Award for Lifetime Achievement in the field of science fiction scholarship in 1982. He died on September 5, 2010, in Las Vegas, Nevada.

== Bibliography ==
- Anatomy of Wonder: A Critical Guide to Science Fiction (5th ed.). Englewood, Colorado: Libraries Unlimited, 2004. ISBN 1-59158-171-0.
- Fantasy and Horror: a critical and historical guide to literature, illustration, film, TV, radio, and the Internet. The Scarecrow Press, Inc., 1999. ISBN 0-8108-3596-7.
- Fantasy Literature. Garland, 1990. ISBN 0-8240-3148-2.
- Horror Literature. Garland, 1990. ISBN 0-8240-4347-2.
- Science Fiction & Fantasy Book Review: The Complete Series, 1979-1980. Borgo Press, 2009. ISBN 0-89370-609-4. (with Robert Reginald)
- What Do I Read Next?: A Reader's Guide to Current Genre Fiction. Detroit; Washington, DC; London: Gale Research Inc., 2006. ISBN 0-7876-9023-6.
