= Pearson's Magazine =

British literary magazine

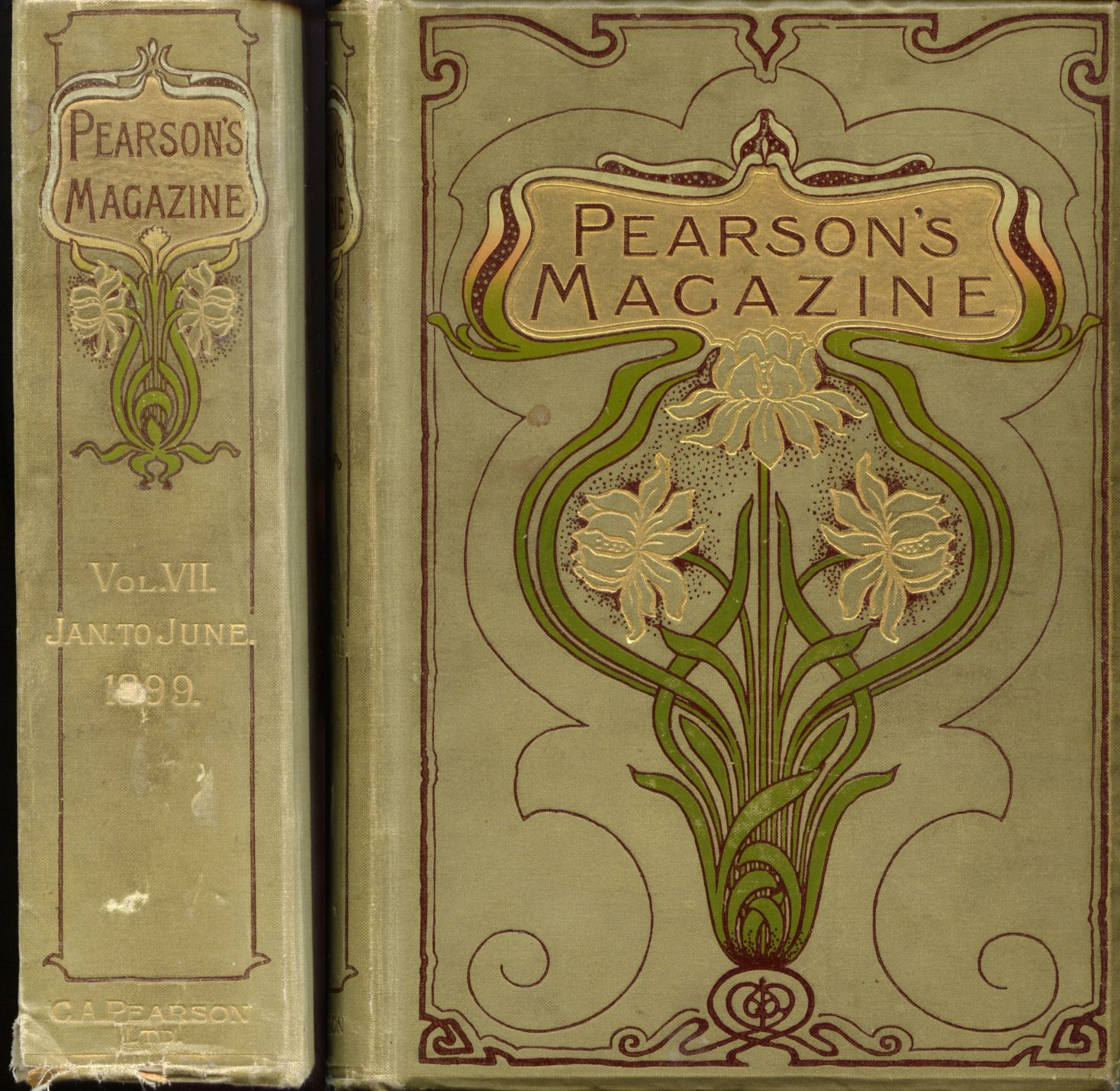
- Bound issues of Pearson's magazine
- Editor: C. Arthur Pearson (1896–1899); Percy W. Everett (1900–1911); Philip O'Farrell (1912–1919); John Reed Wade (1920–1939); W.E. Johns (1939)
- Frequency: Monthly
- Publisher: C. Arthur Pearson Ltd.
- First issue: 1896
- Final issue Number: November 1939; 527
- Company: Pearson Publishing Company
- Country: UK
- Language: English

Pearson's Magazine was a monthly periodical that first appeared in Britain in 1896. A US version began publication in 1899. It specialised in speculative literature, political discussion, often of a socialist bent, and the arts. Its contributors included Bertram Fletcher Robinson, Upton Sinclair, George Bernard Shaw, Maxim Gorky, George Griffith, H. G. Wells, Rudyard Kipling, Rafael Sabatini, Sapper, Dornford Yates and E. Phillips Oppenheim, many of whose short stories and novelettes first saw publication in Pearson's.

It was the first British periodical to publish a crossword puzzle, in February 1922.

== History ==
British publisher C. Arthur Pearson established and served as the editor of the monthly magazine from 1896 to 1899. He removed himself as editor as blindness set in but continued as its publisher. Succeeding editors included:

- Percy W. Everett (1900–1911)
- Philip O'Farrell (1912–1919)
- John Reed Wade (January 1920–April 1939)
- W.E. Johns (May 1939–November 1939).

The magazine ceased publication in November 1939 after 527 issues.

A like-for-like US version of Pearson's appeared in 1899. It eventually diverged into more US-oriented authors and separate editorial oversight, which included:

- Arthur W. Little (to August 1916)
- Frank Harris (September 1916 – 1923)
- Alexander Marky (1922–April 1925).

The United States version was published by J. J. Little until the title folded in April 1925 after a total run of 314 issues.

== Notable serials ==
- H. G. Wells' The War of the Worlds (April–December 1897).
- C. J. Cutcliffe Hyne's The Lost Continent: The Story of Atlantis (July–December 1899)
- George Griffith's Stories of Other Worlds (January–July 1900)
- H. G. Wells' The Sea Lady (1901)
