= A Journey in Other Worlds =

1894 novel by John Jacob Astor IV

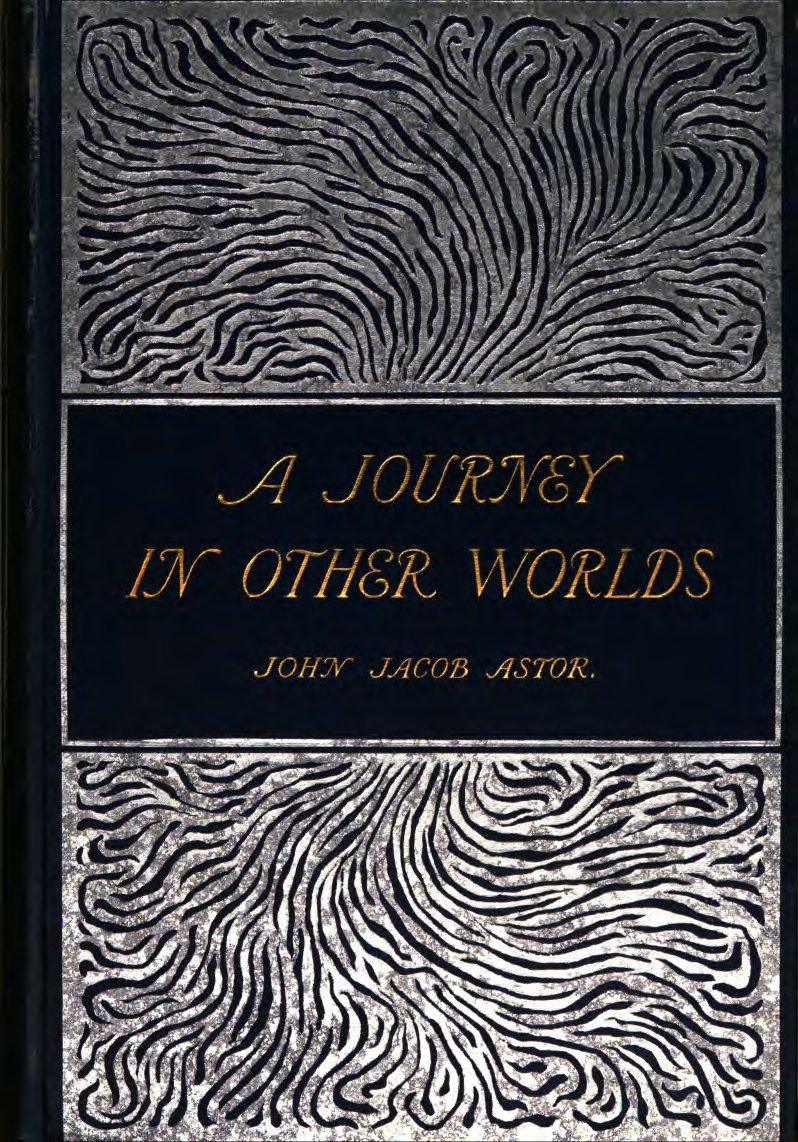
- Author: John Jacob Astor IV
- Illustrator: Dan Beard
- Language: English
- Genre: Science fiction Speculative fiction Utopian fiction
- Publisher: D. Appleton & Co.
- Publication date: 1894
- Publication place: United States
- Media type: Print (hardcover)
- Pages: 476 pp.

A Journey in Other Worlds: A Romance of the Future is a science fiction novel by John Jacob Astor IV, published in 1894.

== Overview ==
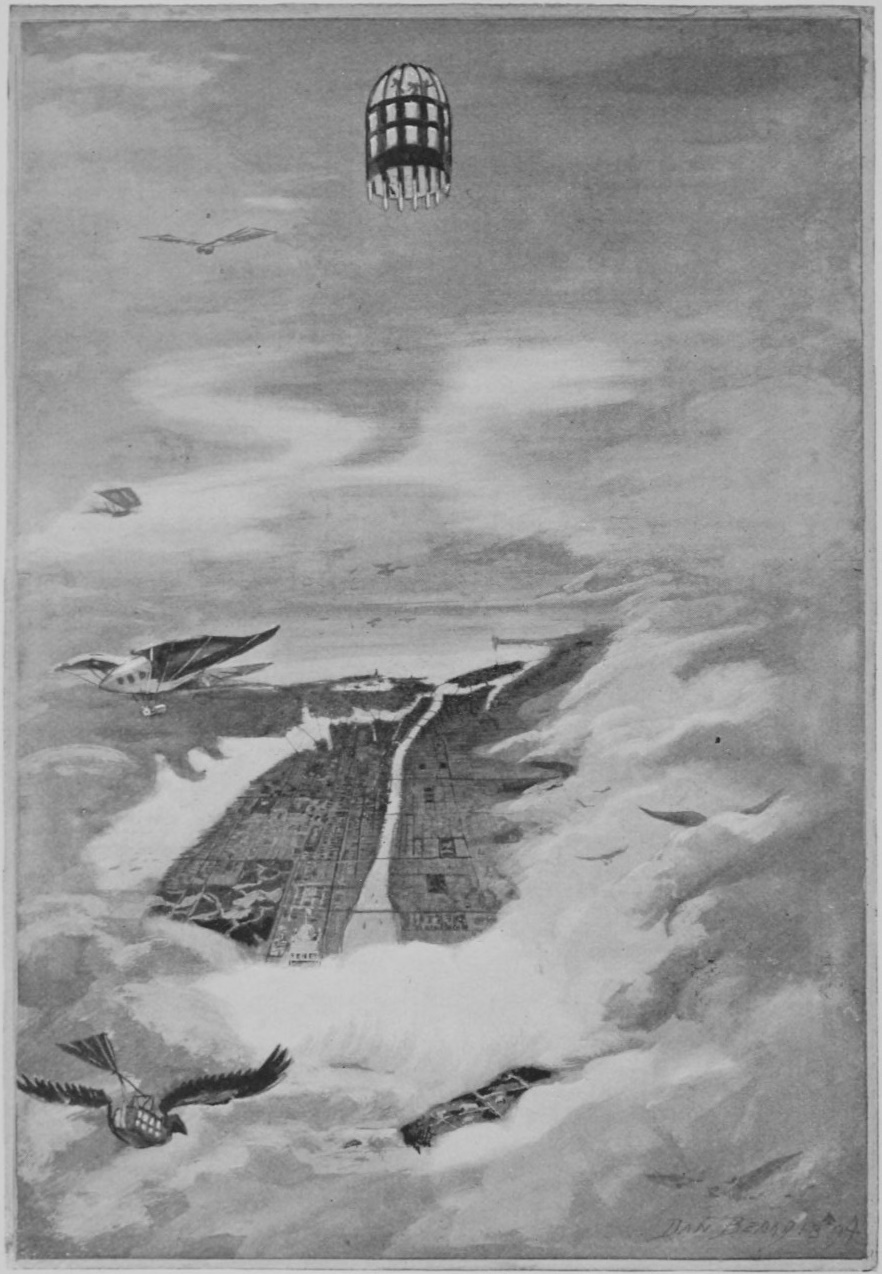
The Callisto was going straight up.

The book offers a fictional account of life in the year 2000. It contains abundant speculation about technological invention, including descriptions of a worldwide telephone network, solar power, air travel, space travel to the planets Saturn and Jupiter, and terraforming engineering projects — damming the Arctic Ocean, and an adjustment of the axial tilt of the Earth (Terra) by the Terrestrial Axis Straightening Company.

The future United States is a multi-continental superpower. European nations have been taken over by socialist governments, which have sold most of their African colonies to the U.S., while Canada, Mexico, and the countries of South America have requested annexation. Space travel is achieved through apergy, an anti-gravitational energy force.

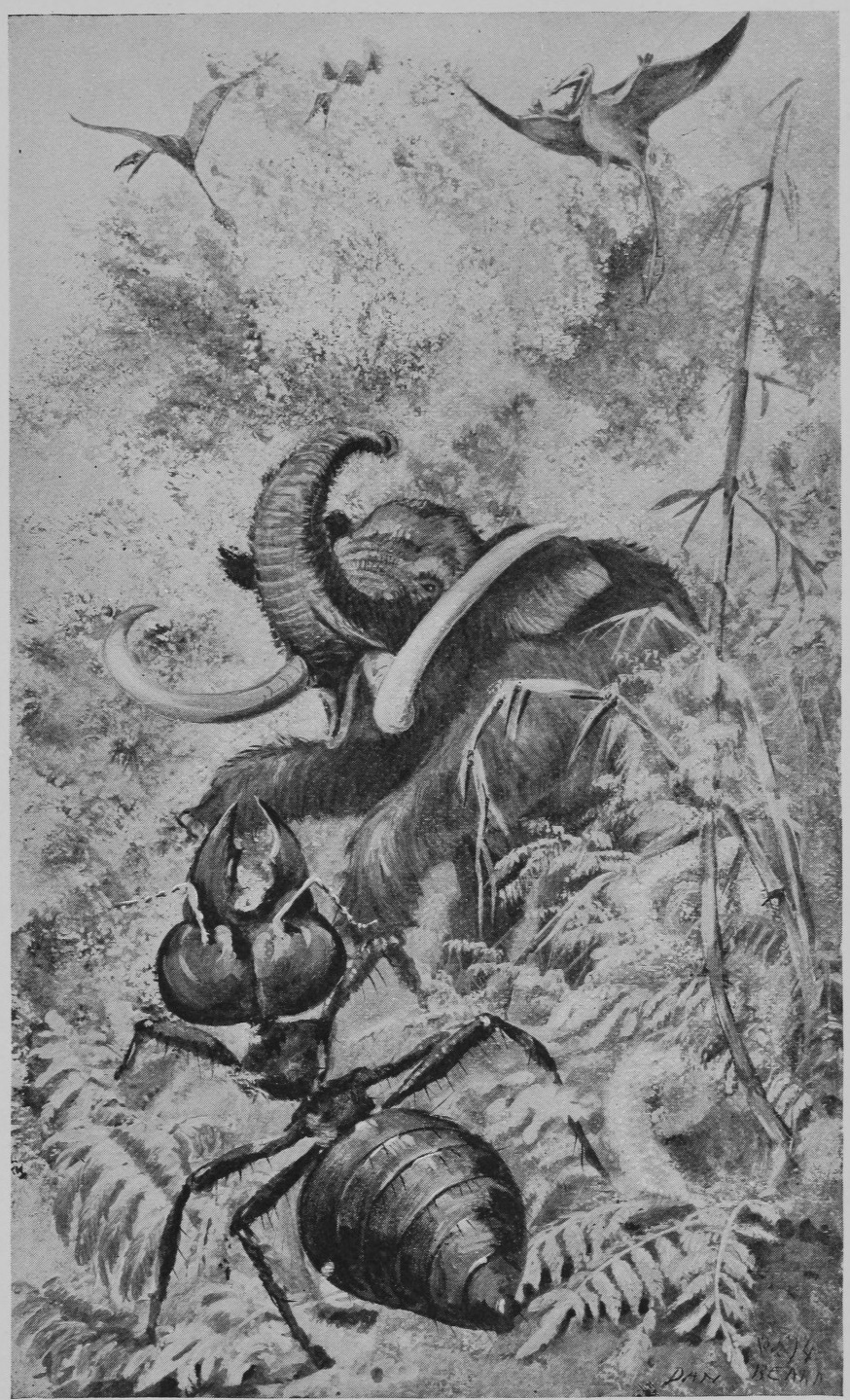
A Battle Royal on Jupiter.

Jupiter proves to be a jungle world, with flesh-eating plants, vampire bats, giant snakes and mastodons, and flying lizards. The Americans discover a wealth of exploitable resources: iron, silver, gold, lead, copper, coal, and oil.

Saturn, in contrast, is an ancient world of silent spirits. These beings provide the explorers with foresight of their own deaths. One of the spirits, a deceased bishop, tells the voyagers about the icy world Cassandra, which orbits the Sun beyond Neptune and is home to the souls of unworthy Earthlings.

== Other editions ==
A paperback edition of A Journey in Other Worlds was issued in 2003.

== See also ==
- Across the Zodiac (1880) by Percy Greg
- Annals of the Twenty-Ninth Century (1874) by Andrew Blair
- The Great Romance (1881) by Anonymous
- Journey to Mars (1894) by Gustavus W. Pope
- Journey to Venus (1895) by Gustavus W. Pope
- A Prophetic Romance (1896) by John McCoy
- A Honeymoon in Space (1901) by George Griffith
