= Annals of the Twenty-Ninth Century =

1874 novel by Andrew Blair

Annals of the twenty-Ninth Century
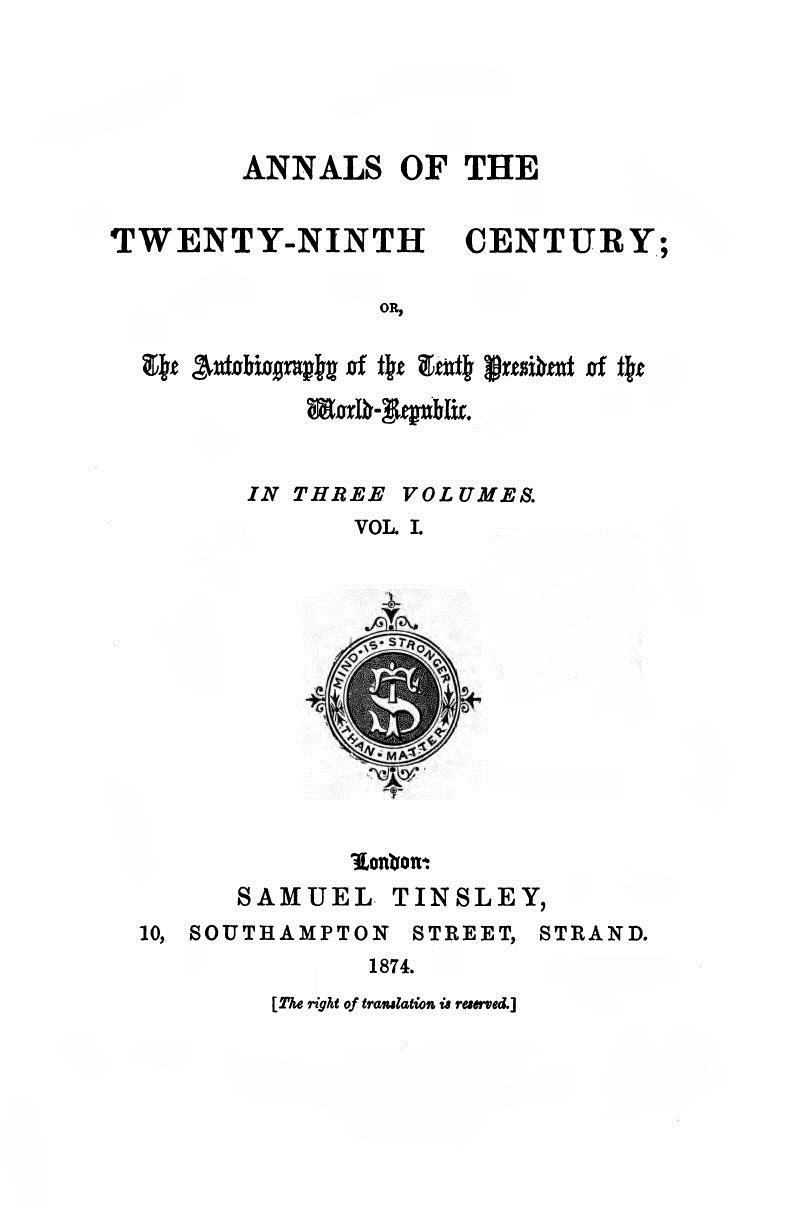
- First edition title page
- Author: Andrew Blair (published anonymously)
- Language: English
- Genre: Science fiction Speculative fiction
- Publisher: Samuel Tinsley
- Publication date: 1874
- Publication place: United Kingdom
- Media type: Print (Hardcover)
- Pages: 758 pp. (3-volume total)

Annals of the Twenty-Ninth Century: or, The Autobiography of the Tenth President of the World-Republic is a science fiction novel written by Andrew Blair, and published anonymously in 1874.

Blair's work is one of a group of early science fiction novels that are now little known, but were influential in their own time—group that includes Edward Maitland's By and By (1873), Percy Greg's Across the Zodiac (1880), and John Jacob Astor IV's A Journey in Other Worlds (1894). Blair tells an extravagant tale of a future age in which the peoples of the Earth have been united in a Christian "Mundo-Lunar Republic", and other planets in the Solar System have been reached and their native inhabitants encountered.

One modern critic has called Blair's book "a hodge-podge of interplanetary travel and super-scientific inventions" but also "a speculation of Stapledonian magnitude." In the view of another, Blair portrays "the union of science and religion...under the sign of a positivist Deism mixed up with various utopian socialisms, and progressing from one technological wonder to another."

== A sample quote ==
The modern U.S. Navy trains dolphins; Blair foresees much more:

...a levy of 40,000 naturalists were engaged for years in forming a hundred different zoological armies. Each of these was, by an admirable system of drill, brought to such a high state of discipline that a brigade, consisting of a thousand elephants, a thousand rhinoceroses, 180,000 monkeys and 15,000 other beasts of draught and burden could be officered with perfect ease by as few as one thousand naturalists. Birds of burden and fish of burden were in like manner drafted into the ranks of the zoological army, and, being subjected to similar training, were brought to a similar degree of efficiency.
