= Percy Greg =

English writer

Percy Greg (7 January 1836 Bury – 24 December 1889, Chelsea), son of William Rathbone Greg, was an English writer.

His Across the Zodiac (1880) is an early science fiction novel, said to be the progenitor of the sword-and-planet genre. For that novel, Greg created what may have been the first artistic language that was described with linguistic and grammatical terminology. It also contains what is believed to be the first instance in the English language of the word "astronaut".

In 2010, a crater on Mars was named Greg in recognition of his contribution to the lore of Mars.

Percy Greg used the pseudonym 'Lionel H. Holdreth' when writing for George Jacob Holyoake's freethinking periodical, The Reasoner, in the 1850s, and he edited the paper for a while in 1859 when Holyoake was ill.

== Bibliography ==
- Across the Zodiac (1880)
- History of the United States to the Reconstruction of the Union (1887)
