= Journey to Mars =

1894 novel by Gustavus W. Pope

- Title page for Journey to Mars the Wonderful World: Its Beauty and Splendor; Its Mighty Races and Kingdoms; Its Final Doom (1894)
- Author: Gustavus W. Pope
- Language: English
- Genre: Science fiction
- Publisher: G. W. Dillingham
- Publication date: 1894
- Publication place: United States
- Media type: Print (Hardcover)
- Pages: 543 pp.
- Followed by: Journey to Venus

Journey to Mars the Wonderful World: Its Beauty and Splendor; Its Mighty Races and Kingdoms; Its Final Doom is an 1894 science fiction novel written by Gustavus W. Pope. (The author called his work a "scientific novel.") The book has attracted increased contemporary attention as a precedent and possible source for the famous Barsoom novels of Edgar Rice Burroughs. A sequel, Journey to Venus, followed in 1895.

Pope's novel is the story of a Lt. Frederick Hamilton, USN. On a voyage to Antarctica, his ship is wrecked; he and a Māori sailor are cast onto a barren island. Though near the end of his endurance, Hamilton rescues a strange-looking man before he loses consciousness. He awakens three weeks later, aboard a spaceship traveling to Mars. (Hamilton at first does not realize his hosts are Martians; he suspects they might have come from within the Hollow Earth through a polar opening, as per John Symmes's theory. Pope also wrote a subterranean fiction novel.)

On Pope's Mars there are three human-like races: red, yellow, and blue Martians. They have attained a sophisticated technology while preserving a feudal society (which allows for duels and swordplay), much as in Burroughs's later books. The Martians travel in "ethervolt cars" and anti-gravity aircraft; they enjoy communications devices that are equivalent to television and video telephone. Pope also provides a Martian magician who is telepathic, invokes spirits, and reads the hero's future.

Hamilton has various adventures, including a romance with the yellow-complexioned Princess Suhlamia. The Martians need to relocate from their world because of impending planetary catastrophe: meteors bombard the planet (the so-called Martian canals are actually linear cities, which makes them thinner targets), and the moons Phobos and Deimos threaten to crash to the surface. Hamilton returns to Earth to try to find space for them. A Martian revolution disrupts his plans, however; he writes no account of his adventures prior to an attempt to return to the red planet.

Gustavus W. Pope (1828–1902) was a physician based in Washington DC, who wrote several books on a range of subjects (including one on Shakespeare's supposed Roman Catholicism). Pope followed his Journey to Mars with Journey to Venus the Primeval World; Its Wondrous Creations and Gigantic Monsters (1895), in which Hamilton and Suhlamia visit that planet.

Journey to Mars has been reprinted in two modern editions, from Hyperion Press in 1974 and from Wildside Press in 2008. The Hyperion edition features an Introduction by Sam Moskowitz.
