= Journey to Venus =

1895 novel by Gustavus W. Pope

- Author: Gustavus W. Pope
- Language: English
- Genre: Science fiction Adventure novel
- Publisher: Arena Publishing Co.
- Publication date: 1895
- Publication place: United States
- Media type: Print (Hardcover)
- Pages: 499 pp.
- Preceded by: Journey to Mars

Journey to Venus the Primeval World; Its Wonderful Creations and Gigantic Monsters is an 1895 science fiction novel written by Gustavus W. Pope. The book was a sequel to Pope's novel of the previous year, Journey to Mars. The Venus volume features the same hero and heroine, United States Navy Lieutenant Frederick Hamilton, and his love interest the Martian princess Suhlamia. They travel to Venus on a Martian "ethervolt" spacecraft.

The publisher promoted the book as "full of exciting adventures, hairbreadth escapes, and perilous vicissitudes, among primeval monsters and semi-human creatures, the episodes following each other in such breathless succession that the interest of the reader never flags."

It is considered one of the first treatments of Venus in science fiction.

Modern critics have noted the book largely for its depiction of giant dinosaur-like Venusian beasts. Pope's pair of novels on Mars and Venus (volumes in a projected Romances of the Planets series that the author never continued) were precursors of popular planetary adventure novels of the twentieth century by Edgar Rice Burroughs, Otis Adelbert Kline, and other writers.

The original edition of Journey to Venus from Arena Publishing Co. featured sixteen illustrations by "Miss Fairfax and Mrs. McAuley." The ensuing "paper-covered" edition reduced the illustrations to three. After the 1896 bankruptcy of Arena Publishing, Journey to Venus was reprinted in 1897 by the New York firm F. T. Neely, with the reduced number of three illustrations.
