= Across the Zodiac =

1880 novel by Percy Greg

Across The Zodiac
- First editions
- Author: Percy Greg
- Language: English
- Genre: Science fiction
- Publisher: Trübner & Co
- Publication date: 1880
- Publication place: United Kingdom
- Media type: Print (Hardback)
- Pages: Vol. 1: 302 pp. Vol. 2: 294 pp.

Across the Zodiac: The Story of a Wrecked Record (1880) is a science fiction novel by Percy Greg, who has been credited as an originator of the sword and planet subgenre of science fiction. It is the first science fiction novel set primarily on Mars. It contains the first documented use of the term "astronaut", here the name of a spacecraft.

== Plot ==
The book details the creation and use of apergy, a form of anti-gravitational energy, and details a flight to Mars in 1830. The planet is inhabited by diminutive beings; they are convinced that life does not exist elsewhere than on their world, and refuse to believe that the unnamed narrator is actually from Earth. (They think he is an unusually tall Martian from some remote place on their planet.)

The book's narrator names his spacecraft the Astronaut.

== Novel concepts ==
The book contains what was probably the first alien language in any work of fiction. His space ship design also featured a small garden, an early prediction of hydroponics.

== Influence ==
The same title was used for a later, similar book—Across the Zodiac: A Story of Adventure (1896) by Edwin Pallander (1869–1952) (the pseudonym of UK biologist, botanist and author Lancelot Francis Sanderson Bayly). Pallander copied some elements of Greg's plot; in his book, gravity is negated by a gyroscope.

== See also ==
- Annals of the Twenty-Ninth Century
- A Journey in Other Worlds
- Mars in fiction
