= Central Wharf (Boston) =

- U.S. Historic district – Contributing property
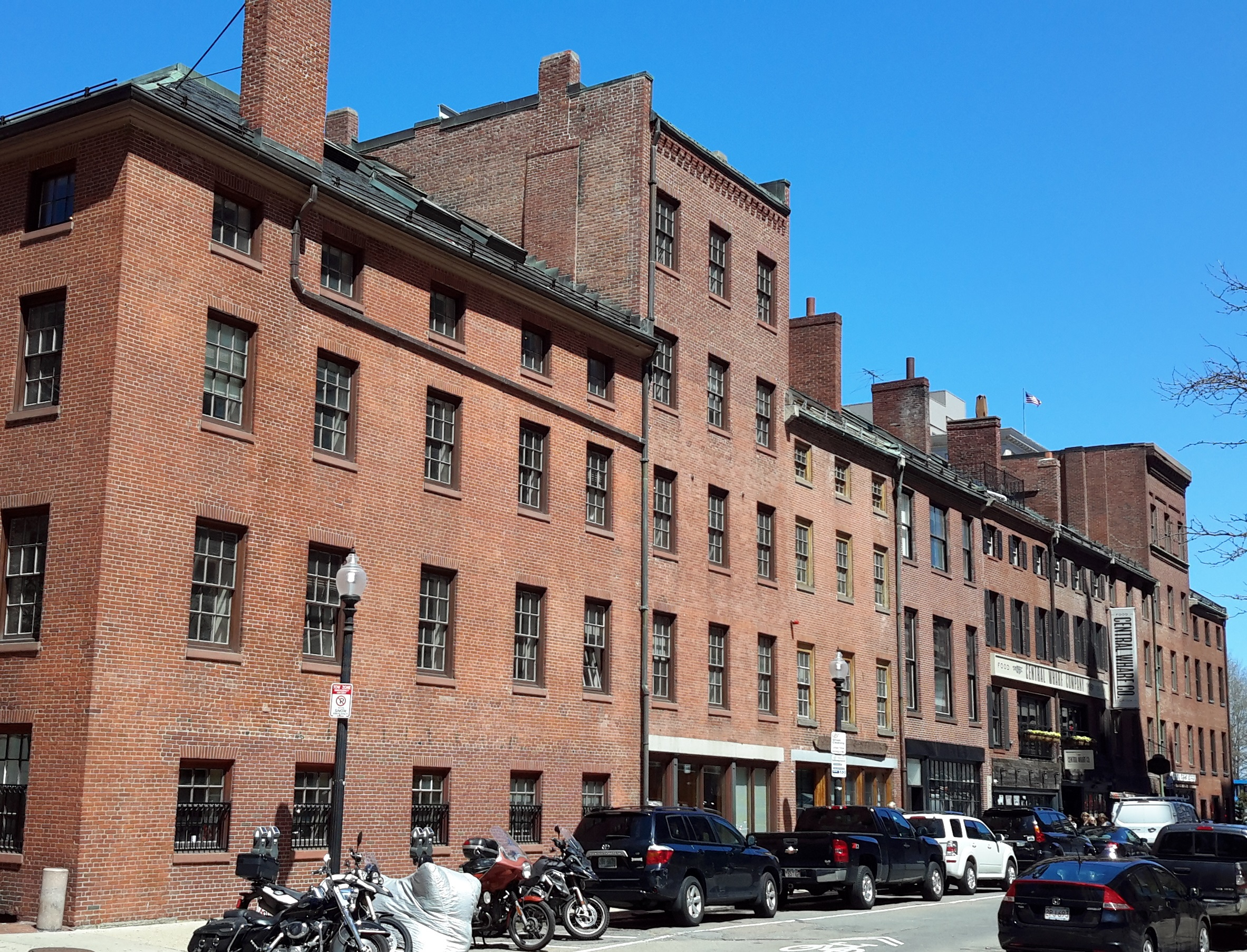
- Former warehouses on Central Wharf, now Milk Street
- Location: 146-176 Milk Street; Boston, Massachusetts
- Coordinates: 42°21′33″N 71°3′1″W
- Built: 1815–1816
- Architectural style: Federal
- Part of: Custom House District (ID73000321)
- Designated CP: May 11, 1973

Central Wharf is a historic pier in Boston, Massachusetts. Built in 1815–1816 between Long Wharf and India Wharf, it originally extended from India Street nearly a quarter-mile into Boston Harbor. Today, the much-shortened wharf (due to land reclamation on the city end) serves as the home of the New England Aquarium.

== History ==
Central Wharf was conceived in the aftermath of the War of 1812, when the restoration and expansion of trade created a need to renovate the Boston waterfront and expand the town's shipping capacity. The project was organized by Ebenezer Francis and was primarily financed by several of the same men who had previously built or invested in India Wharf, namely Uriah Cotting, Harrison Gray Otis, James Lloyd Jr. and Francis Cabot Lowell. Construction of the wharf began on around April 17, 1815, with the store roofs being covered before the end of the following year, and full occupancy was achieved by the beginning of April 1817.

Upon its completion, Central Wharf featured a row of fifty-four warehouses built in the Federal style, with each one measuring four stories in height and three window bays in width. In total, the wharf was one of the town's largest at 1,240 feet long and 150 feet wide, and one contemporary observer noted that "the completion of this undertaking, unparalleled in commercial History, is a proof of the enterprize, the wealth, and persevering industry of Bostonians." Over the next several decades it assumed a prominent position in the town's seaport, becoming the place of business for several eminent merchants and serving as the center of Boston's large Mediterranean trade.

Only a small portion of Central Wharf still exists today, as the majority of the site was demolished in stages over the course of the late 19th and mid-20th centuries. The length of the pier was considerably reduced in ca. 1868 due to land reclamation undertaken for the construction of Atlantic Avenue, which ran through the middle of the wharf, and most of the warehouses were torn down in the 1950s-1970s to make way for several projects, including the building of the Central Artery and the New England Aquarium. The aquarium has since become a major feature on the remaining area of the wharf, having operated there since its opening in 1969.

Of the original warehouses built on Central Wharf, the westernmost eight (at 146-176 Milk Street) have survived into the 21st century, although their facades have undergone varying degrees of alteration from their original appearance. These buildings, which form the last surviving Federal-style wharf complex in the city, were added as part of the Custom House District to the National Register of Historic Places in 1973.

== Gallery ==
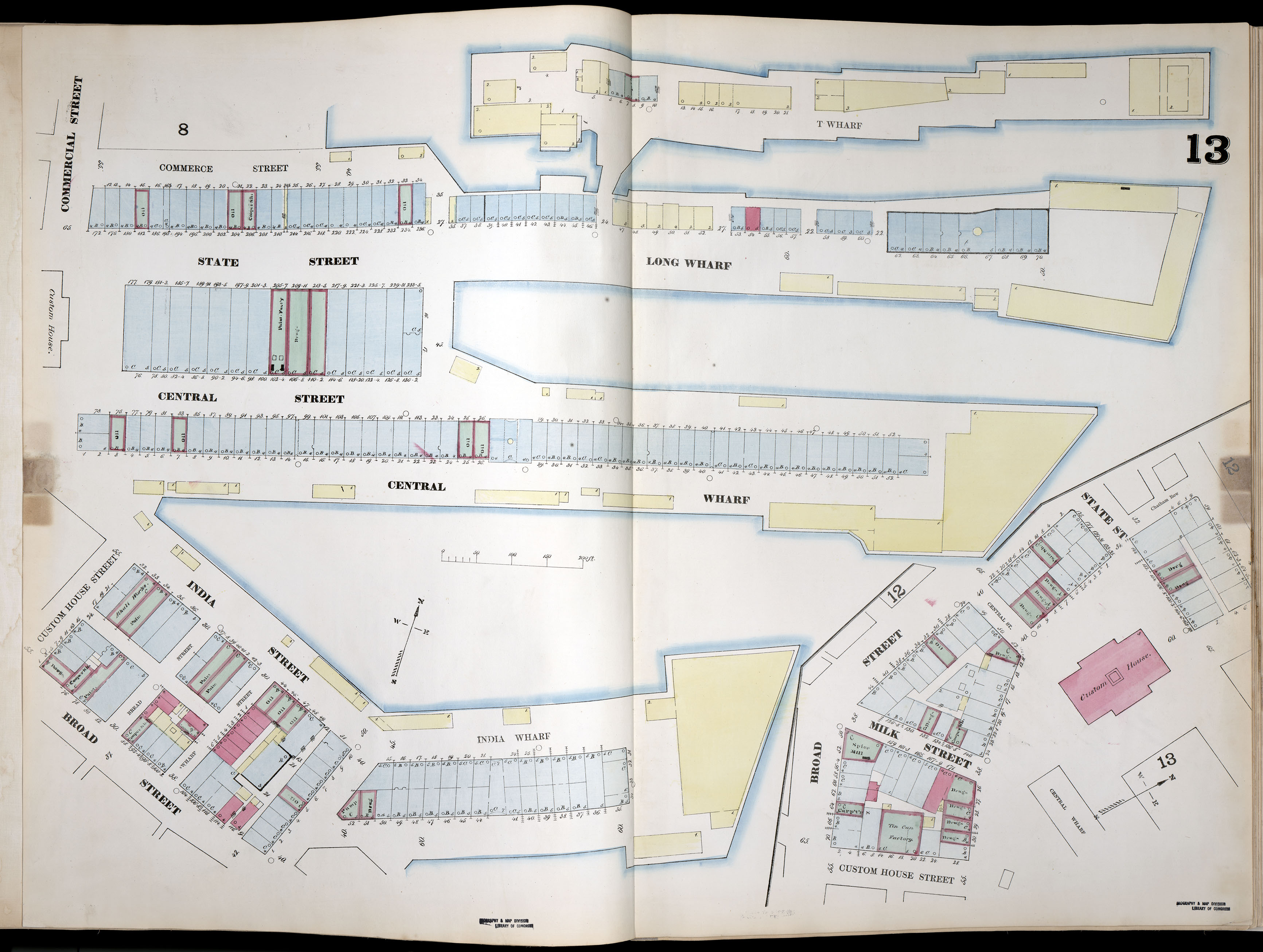
Map of Central Wharf, 1867

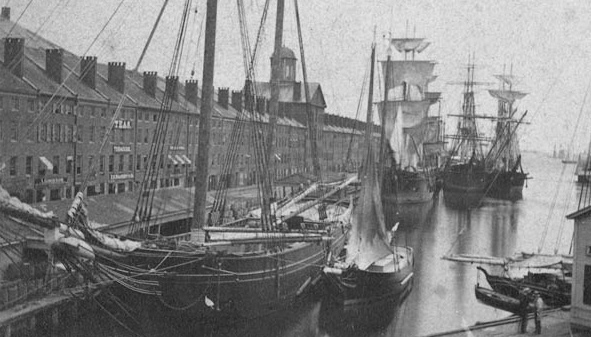
Central Wharf, 19th century. The cupola in the center of the wharf was equipped with a telescope for public use

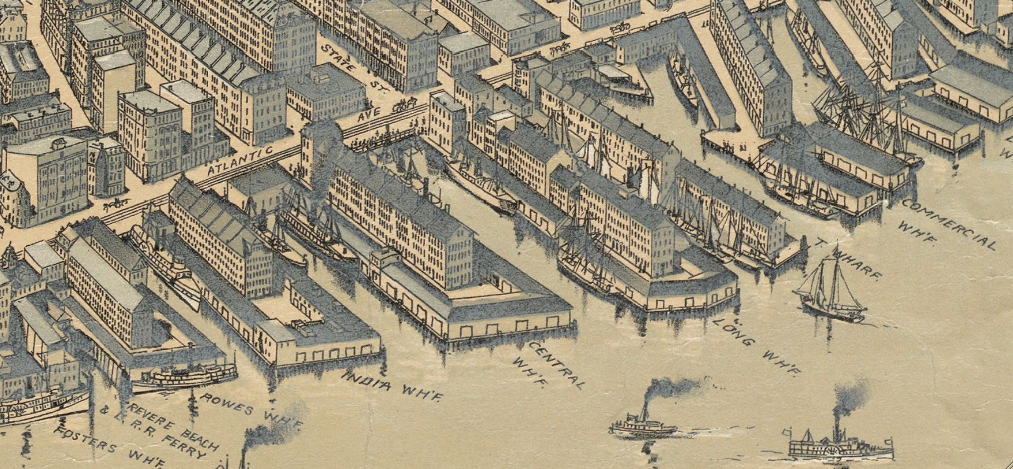
Overview of wharves, 1899, showing Central Wharf bisected by Atlantic Avenue

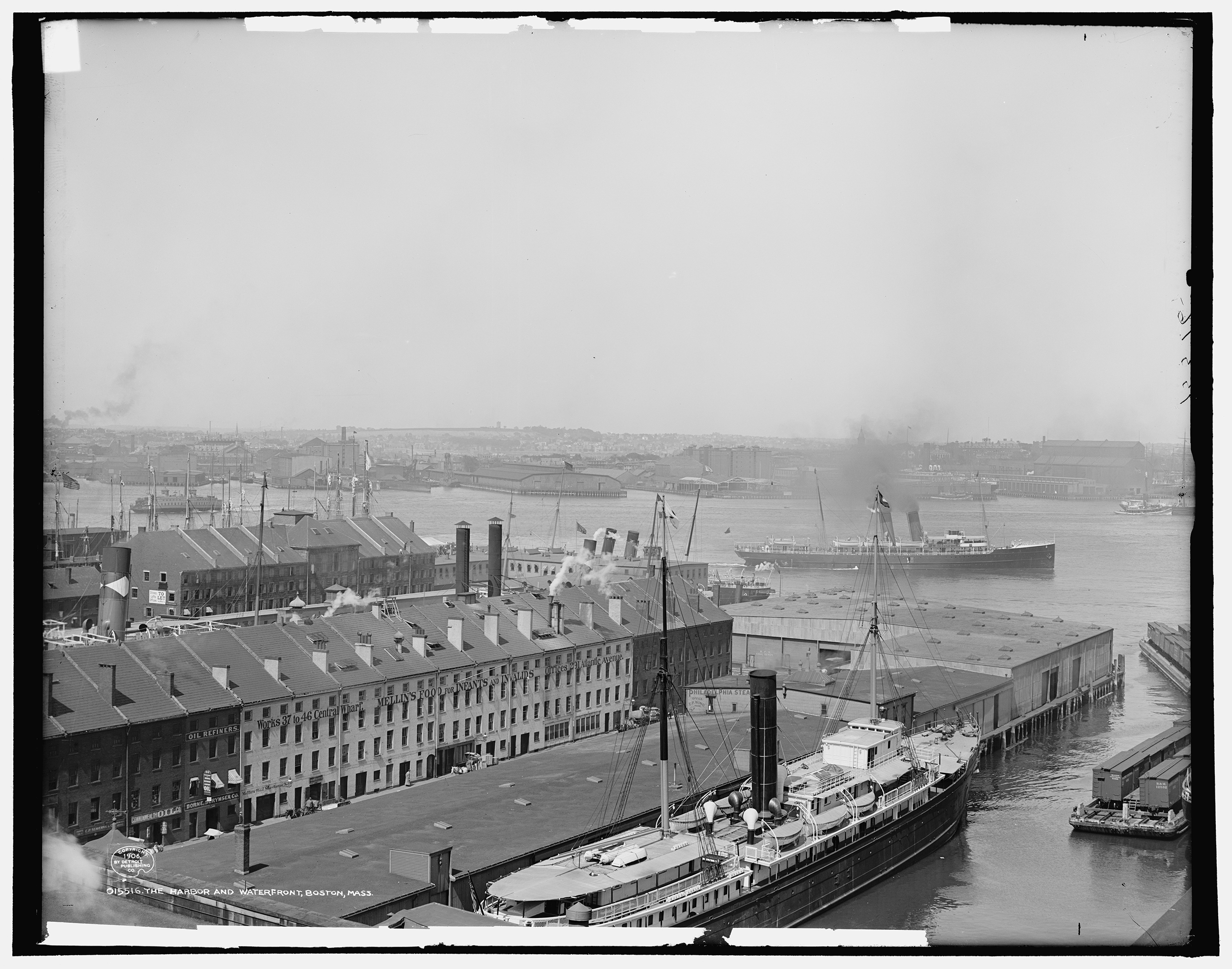
Central Wharf, ca. 1906

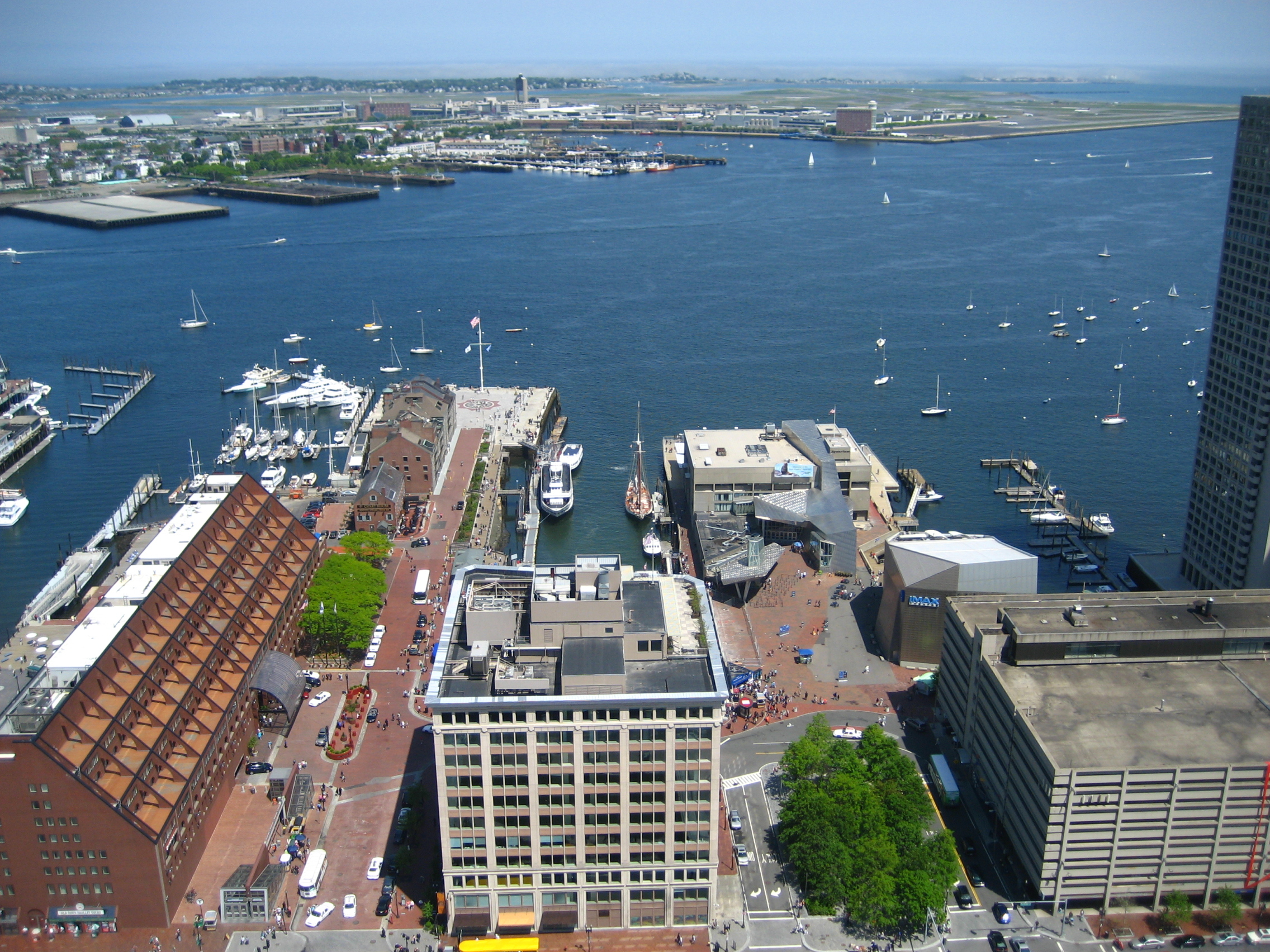
Aerial view of Central Wharf (right), 2010
