= Custom House Tower =

Skyscraper hotel in Boston, Massachusetts

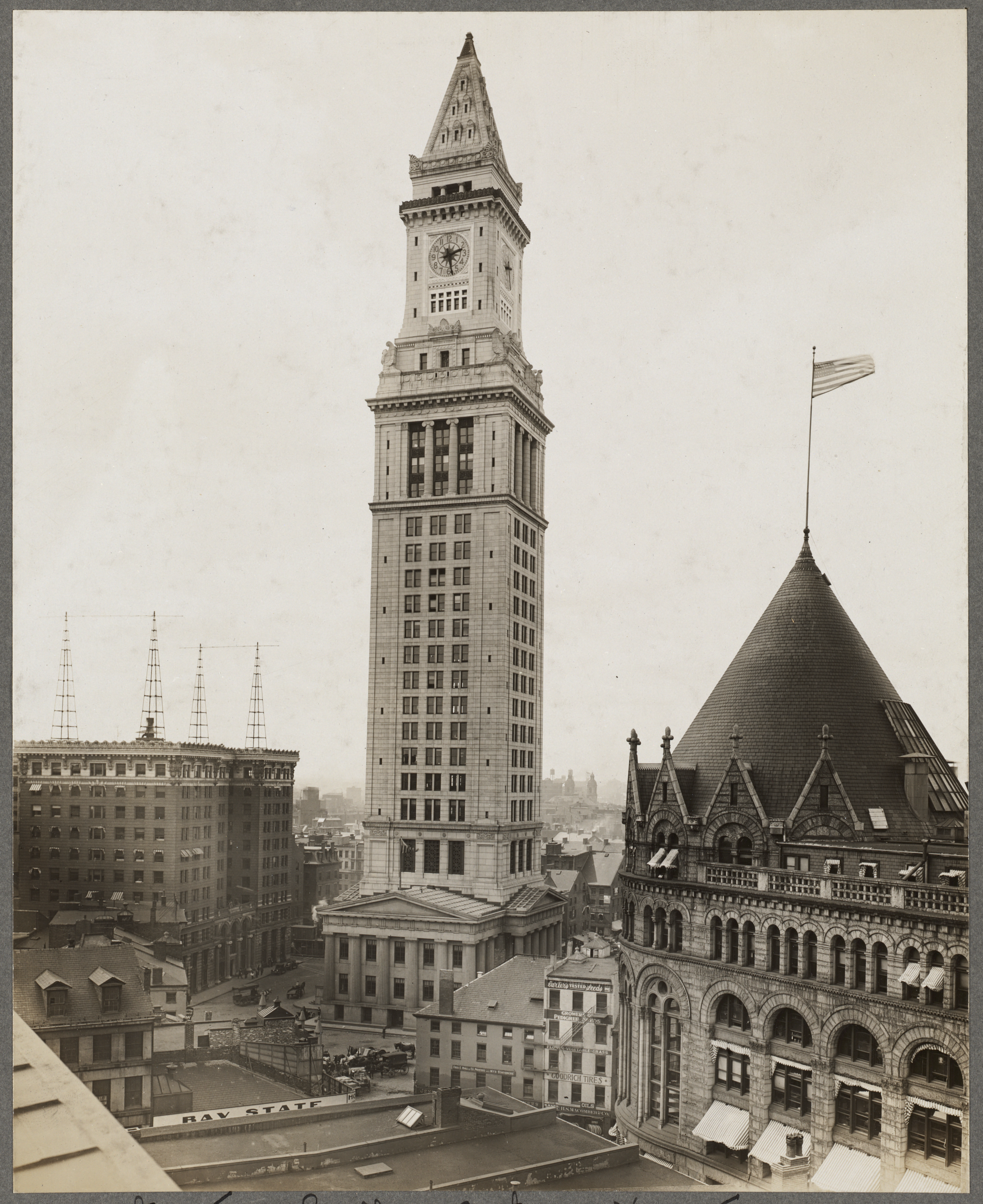
- The tower is supported by the original 1849 Custom House structure in this c. 1915 photo
- Interactive map of the Custom House Tower area

General information
- Type: Hotel
- Location: 3 McKinley Square; Boston, Massachusetts
- Coordinates: 42°21′32.65″N 71°03′12.13″W
- Completed: 1915

Height
- Roof: 496 ft (151 m)

Technical details
- Floor count: 32

Design and construction
- Architect: Peabody and Stearns
- Developer: Jung Brannen Associates, Inc

The Custom House Tower is a skyscraper in McKinley Square, in the Financial District of Boston, Massachusetts. The original building, the Custom House, was constructed between 1837 and 1847 and was designed by Ammi Burnham Young in the Greek Revival style. The tower was designed by Peabody and Stearns and was added between 1913 and 1915. The building is part of the Custom House District, which was added to the National Register of Historic Places in 1973.

Standing at 496 ft (151 m) tall, the building is Boston's 24th-tallest building.

Since 1997, it has housed a Marriott timeshare hotel.

== Original building ==
The site was purchased on September 13, 1837. Construction of a custom house was authorized by U.S. President Andrew Jackson. When it was completed in 1849, it cost about $1.076 million, in contemporary U.S. currency, including the site, foundations, etc.

Ammi Burnham Young entered an 1837 competition to design the Boston Custom House, and won with his neoclassical design. This building was a cruciform (cross-shaped) Greek Revival structure, combining a Greek Doric portico with a Roman dome, resembled a four-faced Greek temple topped with a dome. It had 36 fluted Doric columns, each carved from a single piece of granite from Quincy, Massachusetts; each weighed 42 tons (37 metric tons) and cost about $5,200. Only half these actually support the structure; the others are free-standing. They are 5 feet (1.5 m) and 4 in (10 cm) in diameter and 32 ft (9.8 m) high. Inside, the rotunda was capped with a skylight dome.

The entire structure sits on filled land and is supported by 3,000 wooden piles driven through fill to bedrock. Before land reclamation was done in the middle of the 19th century, Boston's waterfront extended right to this building. Ships moored at Long Wharf almost touched the eastern face of the building. The Custom House was built at the end of the City docks, to facilitate inspection and registration of cargo. The federal government used the building to collect maritime duties in the age of Boston sailing ships.

This description of the original Custom House appears in the 1850 Boston Almanac:

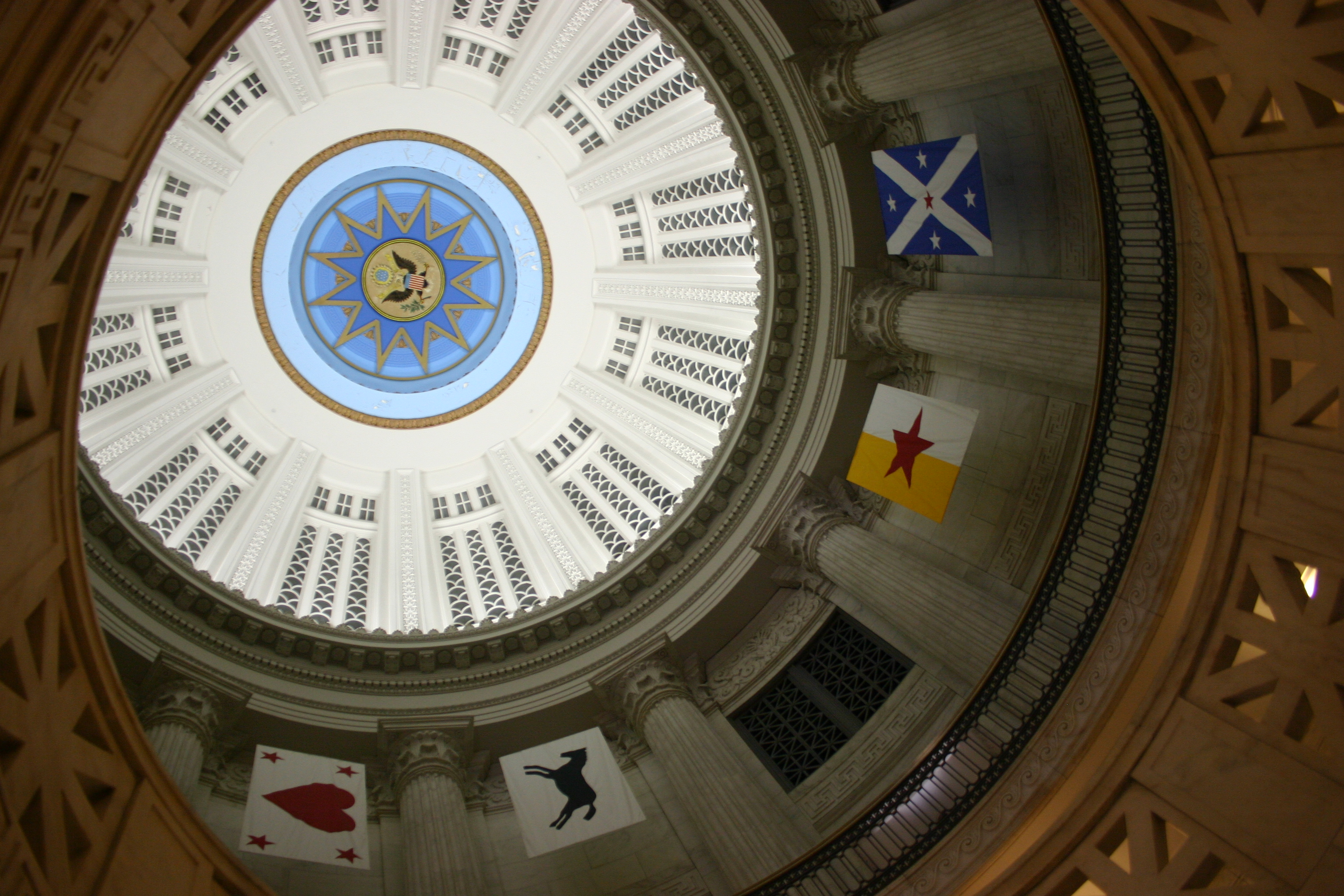
Painting of the Great Seal of the United States inside the original Custom House structure.

Situated at the head of the dock between Long and Central Wharves, fronts east on the dock, west on India Street, and is in the form of a Greek Cross, [with] the opposite sides and ends being alike. It is 140 feet (43 m) long north and south, 75 feet (23 m) wide at the ends, and 95 feet (29 m) through the centre. It is built on about 3,000 piles, fully secured against decay; the construction throughout is fireproof and of the very best kind.

The exterior of the building is purely Grecian Doric, not a copy, but adapted to the exigencies and peculiarities of the structure, and consists of a portico [overhang] of 6 columns on each side, on a high flight of steps, and an order of engaged columns around the walls, 20 in number, on a high stylobate or basement; the order of engaged columns terminating with 4 andae [pilasters] at their intersection with the porticos. The columns are 5 feet 4 inches (1.63 m) in diameter and 32 feet (9.8 m) high, the shaft being in one piece, each weighing 42 short tons/37 metric tons.

The cellar, which is 10 feet 6 inches (3.20 m) high to the crown of the arches, is principally used for the storage of goods, which are conveyed to it through the basement story. The steam apparatus for warming the whole building (which it does effectively) is situated in the cellar, having easy access to the coal vaults under the sidewalk outside of the building.

The principal entrances to the basement story are at each end. They are for the receipt of goods for storage. Near the northwest corner, on the west side, is the entrance to the Night Inspectors' apartments, also to the private staircase leading to the Collector's room and the attic. South of the west portico is the entrance to the heating apparatus room, and on the south end is the entrance to the Custom House Truckmen's room. This story consists of rooms for the Night Inspectors, Custom House Truckmen, and Engineer of the Heating Apparatus, also three sets of Water Closets: the remainder is used for storage of goods, weigher's tabs, etc.

The principal ingress to the entrance story is through the porticos, but it can be entered from the Collector's private staircase, and from two other private staircases in the basement. This story contains apartments and offices for the Assistant Treasurer, the Weighers and Gaugers, the Measurers, Inspectors, Markers, Superintendent of Building, etc. In the centre is a large vestibule, from which two broad flights of steps lead to the principal story, landing in two smaller vestibules therein, lighted by skylights in the roof, and these vestibules communicate with all the apartments in this story. The several rooms are for the Collector, Assistant Collector, Naval Officer, Surveyor, Public Store Keeper, their Deputies and Clerks; and for the facilities of doing business this arrangement is not surpassed. The grand-cross shaped Rotunda, for the general business of the Collector's department, in the centre of this story, is finished in the Grecian Corinthian order; it is 63 feet (19 m) in its greatest length, 59 feet wide, and 62 feet (19 m) in the skylight.

In one of the panels of the Rotunda is inserted a tablet of marble (Dedication Tablet 1847), containing the following inscription: Boston Custom House Building. Authorized by the 23d Congress, A.D. 1835. Andrew Jackson, President U.S.A.; Levi Woodbury, Sec'y of the Treasury.—Opened August 1, A.D. 1847, James K. Polk, President U.S.A.; Robert J. Walker Sec'y of the Treasury; Marcus Morton, Collector of the Port; Samuel S. Lewis, Robert G. Shaw, Commissioners; Ammi Burnham Young, Architect.

== Tower ==
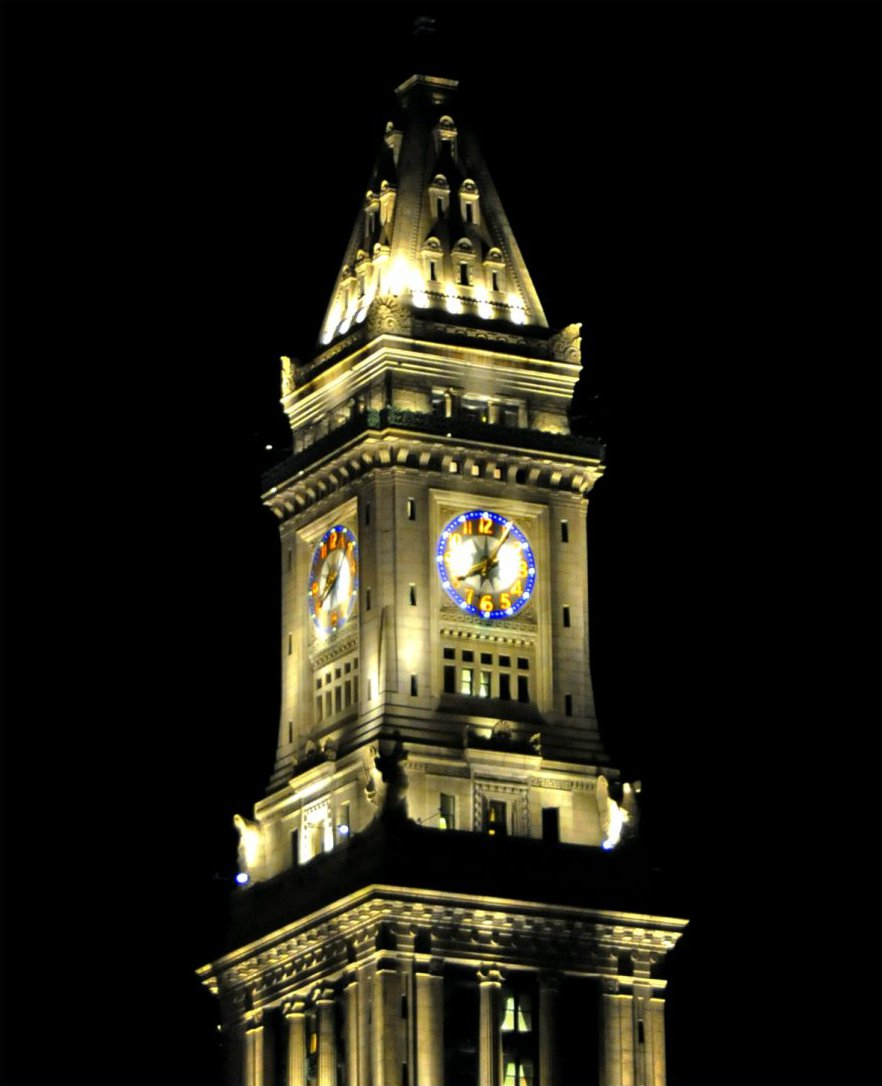
Custom House Tower clock

By 1905, increased shipping required the building's expansion. Between 1913 and 1915, the architecture firm Peabody and Stearns added the tower to the base. Although Boston at that time had a 125 ft (38 m) height restriction, the Custom House was federally owned and exempt from it. The custom house's new 496 ft (151 m) tower made it the city's tallest. In 1947, the Old John Hancock Building, just one foot shorter, joined it in the skies over Boston. In 1964, it was exceeded by the Prudential Tower.

The tower was completed in January 1915 after four and a half years of work. It cost about $1.8 million to build. The tower contains a rotunda made of Vermont white marble covered by a dome. Outside of the top floor is a balcony, which, at the time of the tower's opening, was said to have views of Mount Wachusett, the Peterboro Hills, and the shores of Cape Ann. The dedication ceremony was attended by Assistant Secretary of the Treasury Andrew James Peters, Collector Edmund Billings, Governor David I. Walsh, Mayor James Michael Curley, Cardinal William Henry O'Connell, Bishop William Lawrence, and the building's architect, Robert Swain Peabody. The tower was opened on January 23, 1915. The clock on the upper tower of the building is 22 ft (6.7 m) in diameter. It was started at noon on April 6, 1916. The clock cost $2,500. Its hands were made of gold leaf painted California redwood and weigh 101 and 141 pounds respectively. Because of an undersized motor, the clock failed to work properly through much of the 20th century. In 1960, the Great Seal of the United States was painted in the lobby's dome. Due to aging conditions, the clock's hands were replaced with carbon fiber in December 2020.

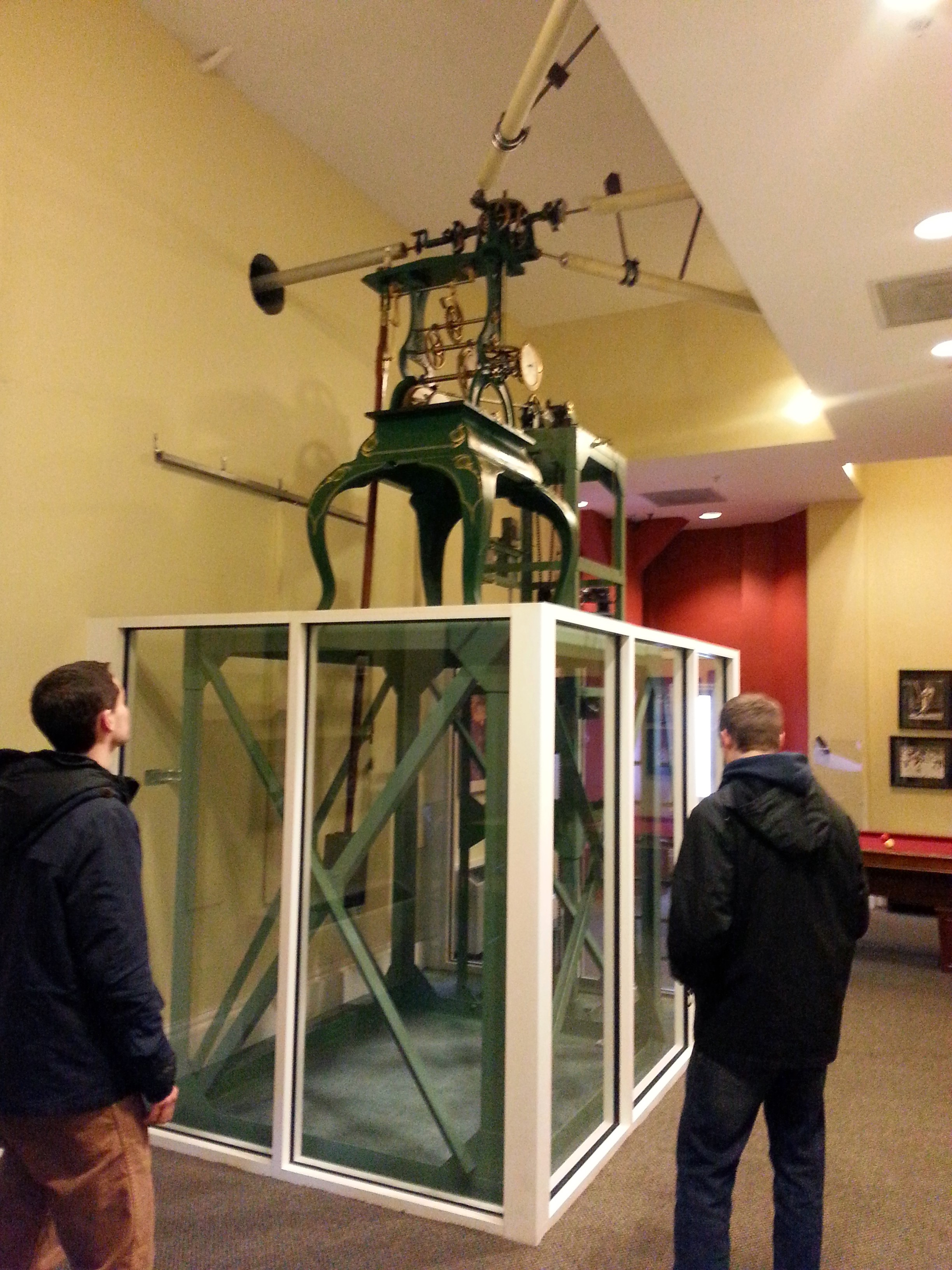
The pendulum and other inner workings that control the Custom House Tower clock's four faces.

== Current use ==
When custom officials moved into the Thomas P. O'Neill building in 1986, the Custom House was declared "surplus property". On April 16, 1987, the city of Boston purchased the building from the General Services Administration, and the building remained unoccupied and inaccessible for 14 years.

The Boston Redevelopment Authority, the Landmarks Commission, the Massachusetts Historical Society, the Beal Companies, and Jung Brannen Associates, Inc. all proposed concepts for the use of the building that ranged from museums to offices to residential developments. In 1995, the Beal Companies and Marriott Ownership Resorts International announced plans to develop the building into a timeshare resort, and retained Jung Brannen Associates as architects. In 1997, work began to convert the building into an 87-room Marriott Vacation Club.

One of the obstacles in converting the structure was the small amount of usable space on each floor of the tower, a problem that several earlier redevelopment plans faced and failed to overcome. The Jung Brannen team created ways to construct four to five suites per floor, using custom-designed built-in cabinetry and furnishings, to maximize the size and number of suites that could fit in the building. The end result was 87 one-bedroom suites with 22 different floor plans. Amenities included a private lounge, exercise area and game room and a refurbished observation deck on the tower's 26th floor. A rotunda-level maritime museum and exhibit room are among the public spaces that occupy the newly refurbished ground floor. Marriott's Custom House opened in August 1997 as a timeshare hotel property. More recently, it was renamed Marriott Vacation Club Pulse at Custom House, Boston.

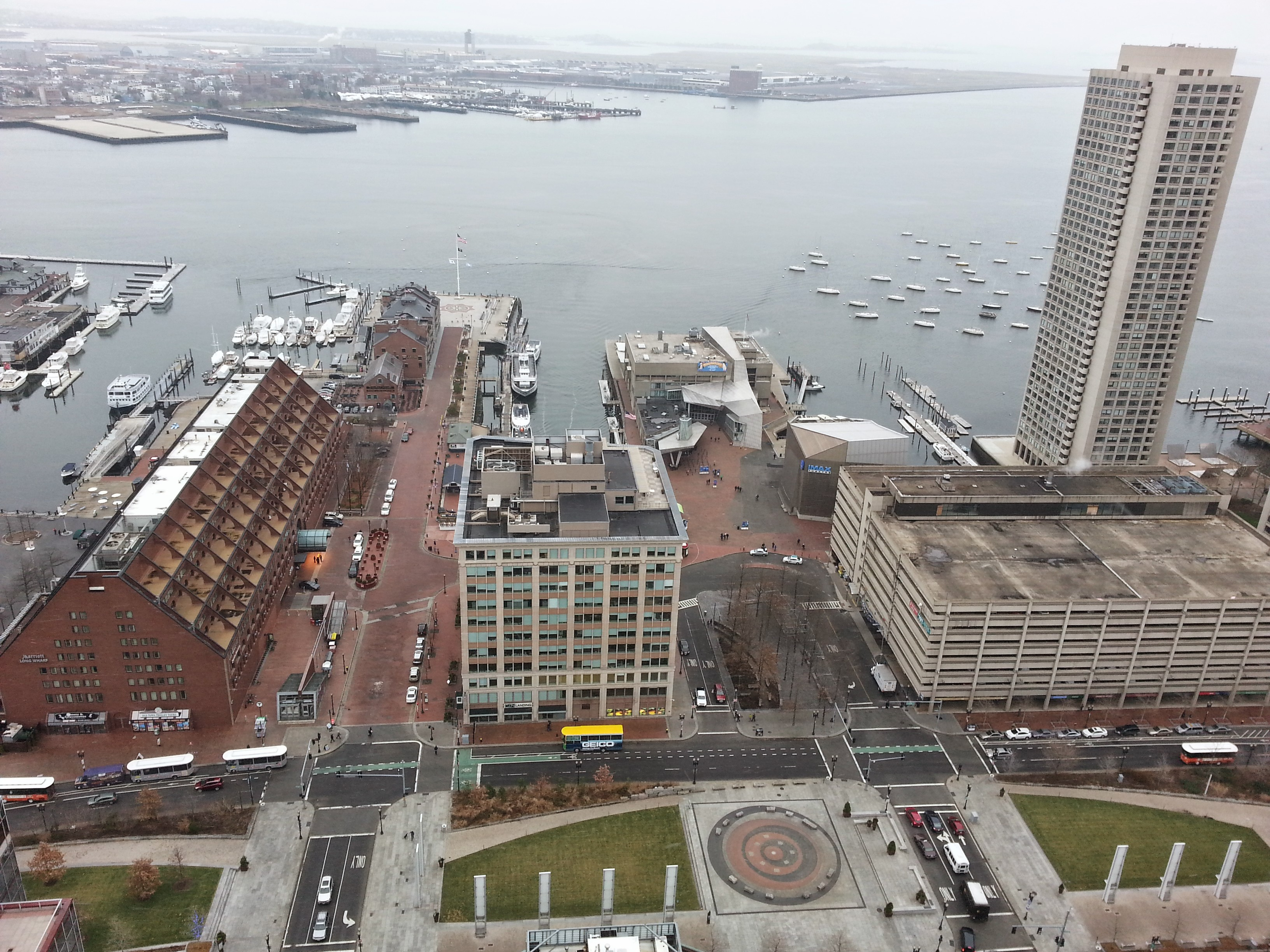
A view to the east from the top of the tower in 2014.

Landscape designers Pressley Associates, Inc. redesigned the front plaza in 1999, and remarked:

It provides a new urban linkage space that provides a sense of cohesion between Custom House Tower and Faneuil Hall and Marketplace Center. As part of the current rehabilitation of the Tower to hotel use, the mandate of the landscape architectural design was to unify and revitalize the urban environment while respecting the buildings' historical importance. A 1-acre (4,000 m^{2}) plaza has been designed to encourage pedestrian access and use, and to relate contextually to the adjacent Faneuil Hall Markets and Marketplace Center through the extensive use of large caliper shade trees, brick and granite pavements, and high quality site furnishings. The scope of work provided includes site design, construction documents, approvals process, presentations, resident engineering and construction support services.

The top of the tower is now accessible to the public during limited hours for a small fee. A fenced-in area surrounds the top floor and allows visitors to view the city on all sides of the tower. Peregrine falcons have been using the tower as a nesting site since 1987, and they can be viewed during nesting season through a live feed.

Preceded by Church of the Covenant	Tallest Building in Boston; 1915–1964; 151 m	Succeeded by Prudential Tower
