= Boston Custom House =

Building in Boston, Massachusetts

Coordinates: 42.3591°N 71.0535°W

The Custom House in Boston, Massachusetts, was established in the 17th century and stood near the waterfront in several successive locations through the years. In 1849 the U.S. federal government constructed a neoclassical building on State Street; it remains the "Custom House" known to Bostonians today. A tower was added in 1915; the building joined the National Register of Historic Places in 1973 and was designated a Boston Landmark by the Boston Landmarks Commission in 1986.

== History ==
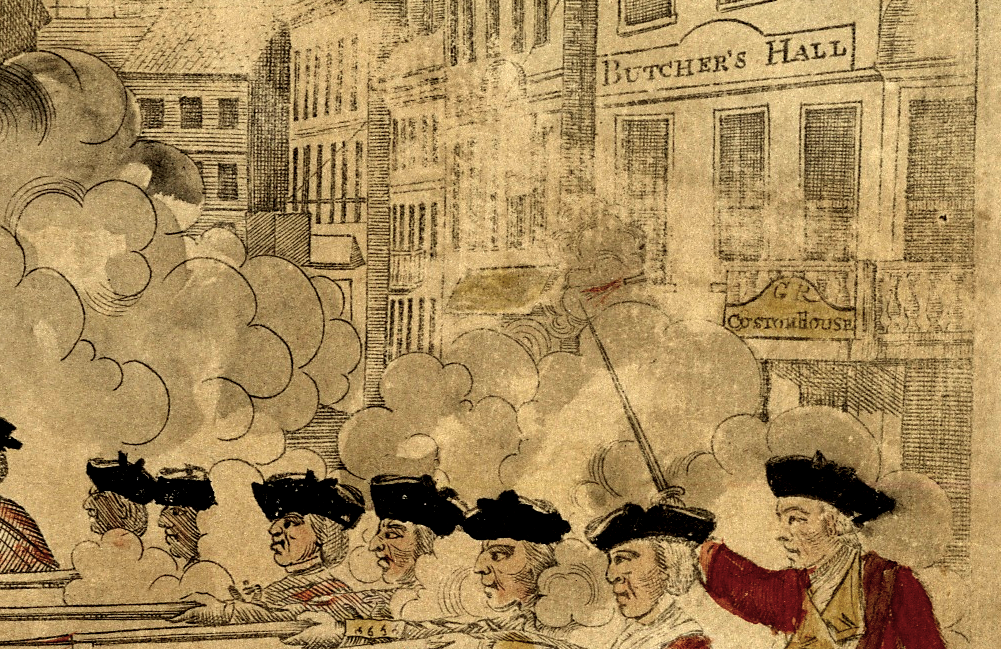
Detail of Paul Revere's engraving of the Boston Massacre, 1770; Custom House visible at right

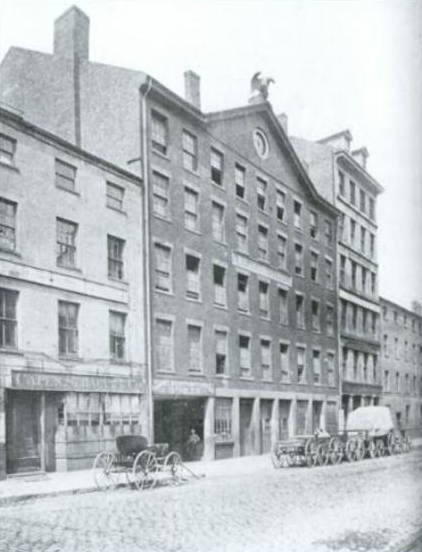
Custom-House, Custom House Street, Boston (built 1810)

Custom houses have existed at several locations:

- Richmond St. and Ann St.; built 1674, demolished 1847. "It was built in 1674, for a Custom House, and used some time for that purpose. Originally, it stood on the water's edge."
- State Street, c. 1770–1805
- Custom House Street (between Broad St. and India St.); c. 1823–1841
- McKinley Square, India Square and State Street, 1849–1986

=== Early buildings ===
The Royal Commissioners of Customs administered customs in Boston during the colonial period. In the late 17th century, the custom house was located at the waterfront, on the corner of Richmond St. and Ann St.

At the time of the Boston Massacre in 1770, it was located on King Street, very near the Old State House. Paul Revere's illustration of the massacre depicts the customhouse (along the right-most edge of the picture). After the revolution, the custom house remained on State Street. Employees included Thomas Melvill (1786–1820).

In 1810 it moved into a new building on Custom House Street (between Broad St. and India St.). In the 1830s American author Nathaniel Hawthorne worked there.

=== Construction of current building ===
A new site on State Street was purchased by the federal government on September 13, 1837. Construction of a custom house was authorized by U.S. President Andrew Jackson. When it was completed in 1849, it cost about $1.076 million, in contemporary U.S. currency, including the site, foundations, etc.

Ammi Burnham Young entered an 1837 competition to design the Boston Custom House, and won with his neoclassical design. This building was a cruciform (cross-shaped) Greek Revival structure, combining a Greek Doric portico with a Roman dome, resembled a four-faced Greek temple topped with a dome. It had 36 fluted Doric columns, each carved from a single piece of granite from Quincy, Massachusetts; each weighed 42 tons (37 metric tons) and cost about $5,200. Only half these actually support the structure; the others are free-standing. They are 5 feet (1.5 m) and 4 inches (162 cm) in diameter and 32 feet (9.7 m) high. Inside, the rotunda was capped with a skylight dome.

The entire structure sits on filled land and is supported by 3,000 wooden piles driven through fill to bedrock. Before land reclamation was done in the mid-19th century, Boston's waterfront extended right to this building. Ships moored at Long Wharf almost touched the eastern face of the building. The Custom House was built at the end of the City docks, to facilitate inspection and registration of cargo. The federal government used the building to collect maritime duties in the age of Boston clipper ships.

This description of the original Custom House appears in the 1850 Boston Almanac:

Situated at the head of the dock between Long and Central Wharves, fronts east on the dock, west on India Street, and is in the form of a Greek Cross, [with] the opposite sides and ends being alike. It is 140 feet (43 m) long north and south, 75 feet (23 m) wide at the ends, and 95 feet (29 m) through the centre. It is built on about 3,000 piles, fully secured against decay; the construction throughout is fireproof and of the very best kind.

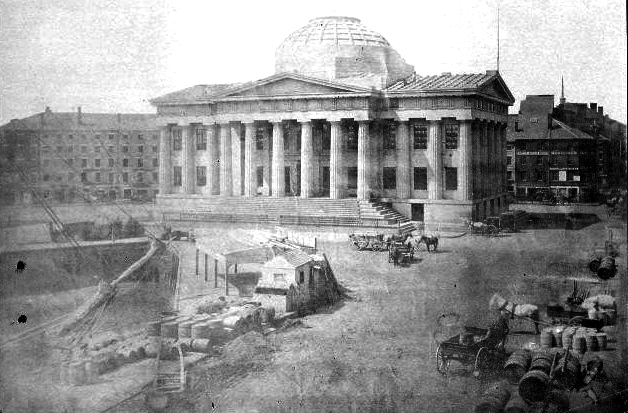
Custom House, Boston, India St., 1850

The exterior of the building is purely Grecian Doric, not a copy, but adapted to the exigencies and peculiarities of the structure, and consists of a portico [overhang] of 6 columns on each side, on a high flight of steps, and an order of engaged columns around the walls, 20 in number, on a high stylobate or basement; the order of engaged columns terminating with 4 andae [pilasters] at their intersection with the porticos. The columns are 5 feet 4 inches (1.63 m) in diameter and 32 feet (9.8 m) high, the shaft being in one place, each weighing about 42 tons.

The cellar, which is 10 feet 6 inches (3.20 m) high to the crown of the arches, is principally used for the storage of goods, which are conveyed to it through the basement story. The steam apparatus for warming the whole building (which it does effectively) is situated in the cellar, having easy access to the coal vaults under the sidewalk outside of the building.

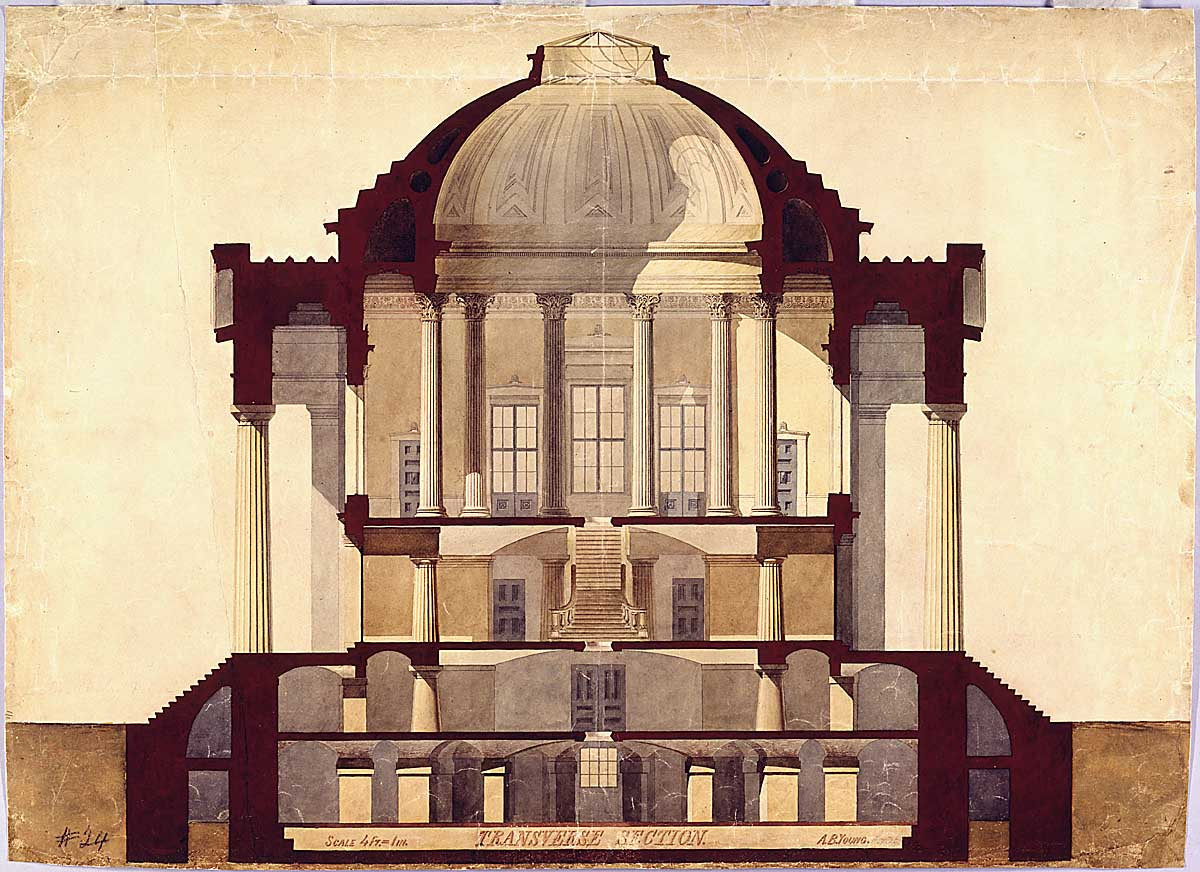
Cross-section of the 1837 design of the Custom House.

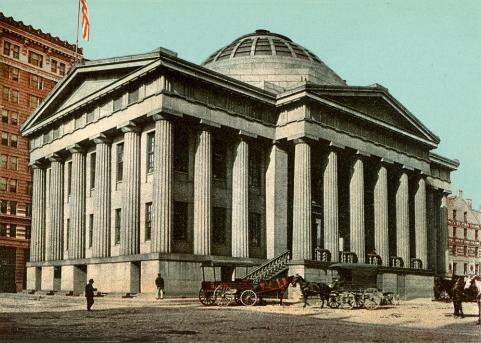
Custom House, c. 1905

The principal entrances to the basement story are at each end. They are for the receipt of goods for storage. Near the northwest corner, on the west side, is the entrance to the Night Inspectors' apartments, also to the private staircase leading to the Collector's room and the attic. South of the west portico is the entrance to the heating apparatus room, and on the south end is the entrance to the Custom House Truckmen's room. This story consists of rooms for the Night Inspectors, Custom House Truckmen, and Engineer of the Heating Apparatus, also three sets of Water Closets: the remainder is used for storage of goods, weigher's tabs, etc.

The principal ingress to the entrance story is through the porticos, but it can be entered from the Collector's private staircase, and from two other private staircases in the basement. This story contains apartments and offices for the Assistant Treasurer, the Weighers and Gaugers, the Measurers, Inspectors, Markers, Superintendent of Building, etc. In the centre is a large vestibule, from which two broad flights of steps lead to the principal story, landing in two smaller vestibules therein, lighted by skylights in the roof, and these vestibules communicate with all the apartments in this story. The several rooms are for the Collector, Assistant Collector, Naval Officer, Surveyor, Public Store Keeper, their Deputies and Clerks; and for the facilities of doing business this arrangement is not surpassed. The grand-cross shaped Rotunda, for the general business of the Collector's department, in the centre of this story, is finished in the Grecian Corinthian order; it is 63 feet (19 m) in its greatest length, 59 feet wide, and 62 feet (19 m) in the skylight.

In one of the panels of the Rotunda is inserted a tablet of marble (Dedication Tablet 1847), containing the following inscription: Boston Custom House Building. Authorized by the 23d Congress, A.D. 1835. Andrew Jackson, President U.S.A.; Levi Woodbury, Sec'y of the Treasury.—Opened August 1st, A.D. 1847, James K. Polk, President U.S.A.; Robert J. Walker Sec'y of the Treasury; Marcus Morton, Collector of the Port; Samuel S. Lewis, Robert G. Shaw, Commissioners; Ammi Burnham Young, Architect.

=== Addition of tower ===
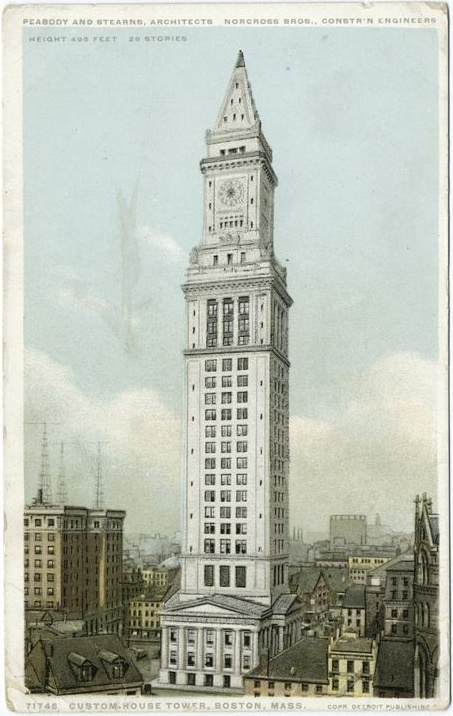
Custom House Tower, early 20th century

By 1905, increased shipping required the building's expansion. In 1913–1915, the architecture firm Peabody and Stearns added a 496 ft (151 m) tower to the base. It was the tallest building in both Boston and New England for almost half a century, until the Prudential Tower surpassed it in 1964.

=== Later history ===
In 1986 when custom officials of the United States Customs Service moved to the Thomas P. O'Neill Jr. Federal Building in the West End, the Custom House on State Street was declared "surplus property". On April 16, 1987, the city of Boston purchased the building from the General Services Administration. The building remained unoccupied and inaccessible for 14 years. It was converted into an 84-room time share resort by Marriott Vacation Club International starting in 1997.

Since 2003, customs functions lie under the dominion of the U.S. Customs and Border Protection, housed in Boston's O'Neill Federal Building.

== Image gallery ==
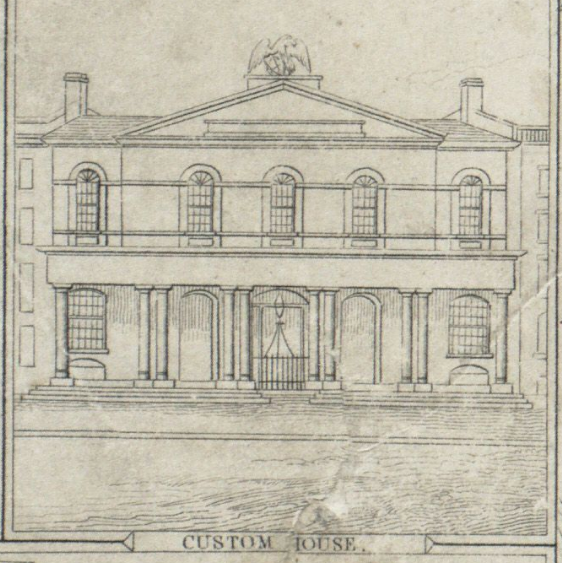
Custom House, Custom House St., 1835

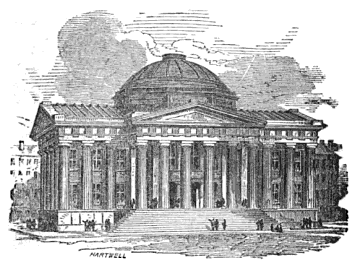
Custom House, India St., Boston, ca.1851; engraving by Alonzo Hartwell

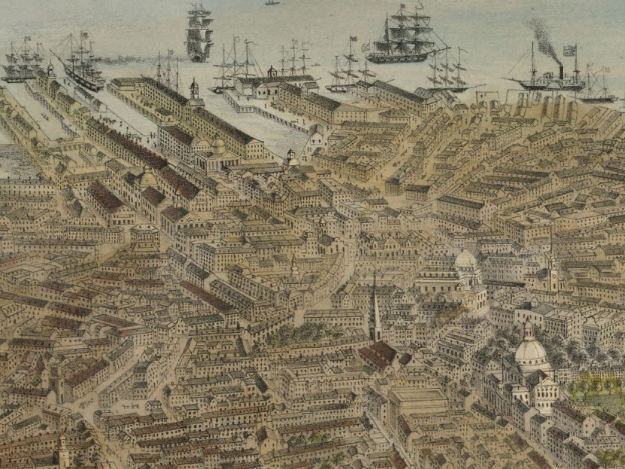
Overview of Boston's Financial District and harbor, showing the Custom House, next to State Street Block (Boston), between Long Wharf and India Wharf, 1870

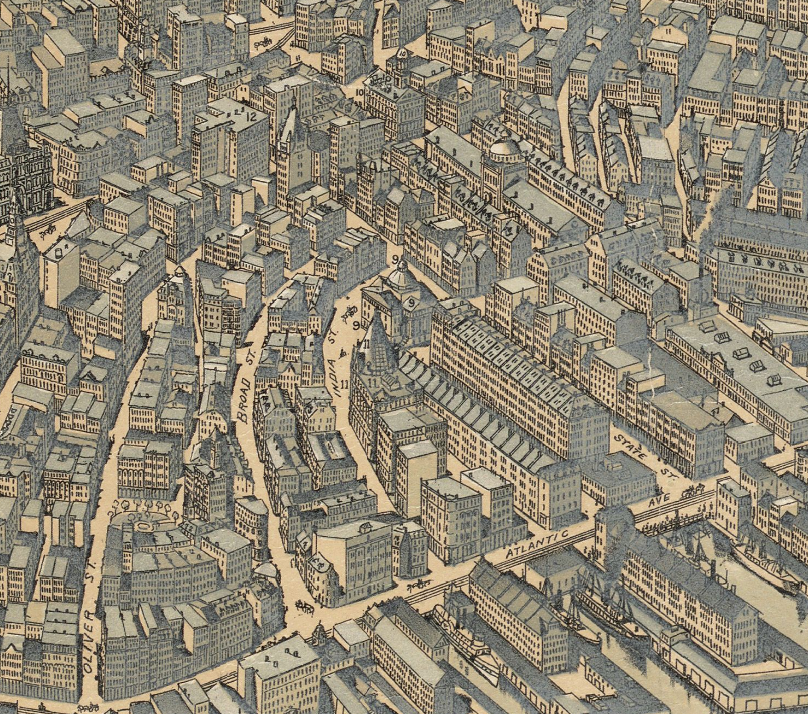
Overview of Boston's Financial District, showing the Custom House, India St., 1899

== See also ==
- Custom House Tower, built 1915
- Custom House District
- National Register of Historic Places listings in northern Boston
