= Custom House District =

Historic district in Massachusetts, United States

- U.S. National Register of Historic Places
- U.S. Historic district
- Boston Landmark
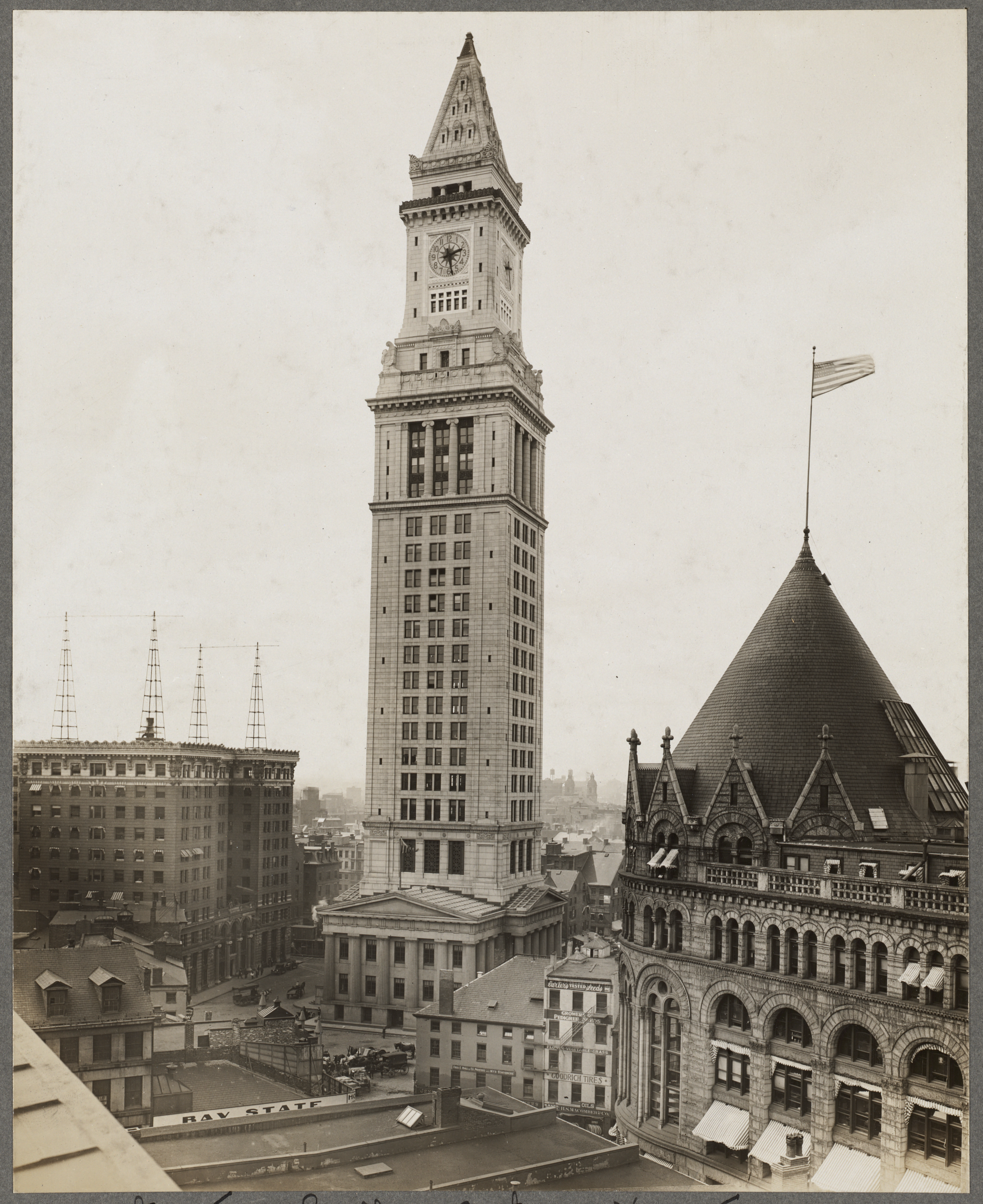
- Custom House Tower (1915), constructed atop the 1849 Boston Custom House

- Location within Boston Location within Massachusetts Location within the United States
- Location: Boston, Massachusetts
- Coordinates: 42°21′28″N 71°3′12″W
- Architect: Multiple
- Architectural style: Skyscraper, Art Deco, Late 19th And 20th Century Revivals
- NRHP reference No.: 73000321

Significant dates
- Added to NRHP: May 11, 1973
- Designated BOSL: July 29, 1986 (Custom House and Custom House Tower only)

Custom House District is a historic district in Boston, Massachusetts, located between the Fitzgerald Expressway (now Purchase St. / the Rose Fitzgerald Kennedy Greenway) and Kilby Street and South Market and High and Batterymarch Streets. Named after the 1849 Boston Custom House located on State Street, the historic district contains about seventy buildings on nearly sixteen acres in Downtown Boston, consisting of 19th-century mercantile buildings along with many early 20th-century skyscrapers, including the 1915 Custom House Tower.

The area is an early example of urban planning, in which the Broad Street Associates hired architect Charles Bulfinch in 1805 to plan the commercial development of the area south of Long Wharf and State Street, which connected the wharf to the city center. The district includes a few Federal period buildings that were built to the standards specified by Bulfinch, but is architecturally diverse, reflecting more than century of economic development. Visually prominent 19th-century buildings include a collection of warehouses built out granite, which marked a departure from the more usual brick construction of the period. The State Street Block, built 1858 to a design by Gridley James Fox Bryant, is another example.

The district was added to the National Register of Historic Places in 1973. When first listed, its historically significant buildings were limited to those of the 19th century. An amendment to the listing in 1996 extended the period of significance to 1928, changing a number of architecturally significant early skyscrapers from non-contributing to contributing properties.

== Contributing properties (partial listing) ==
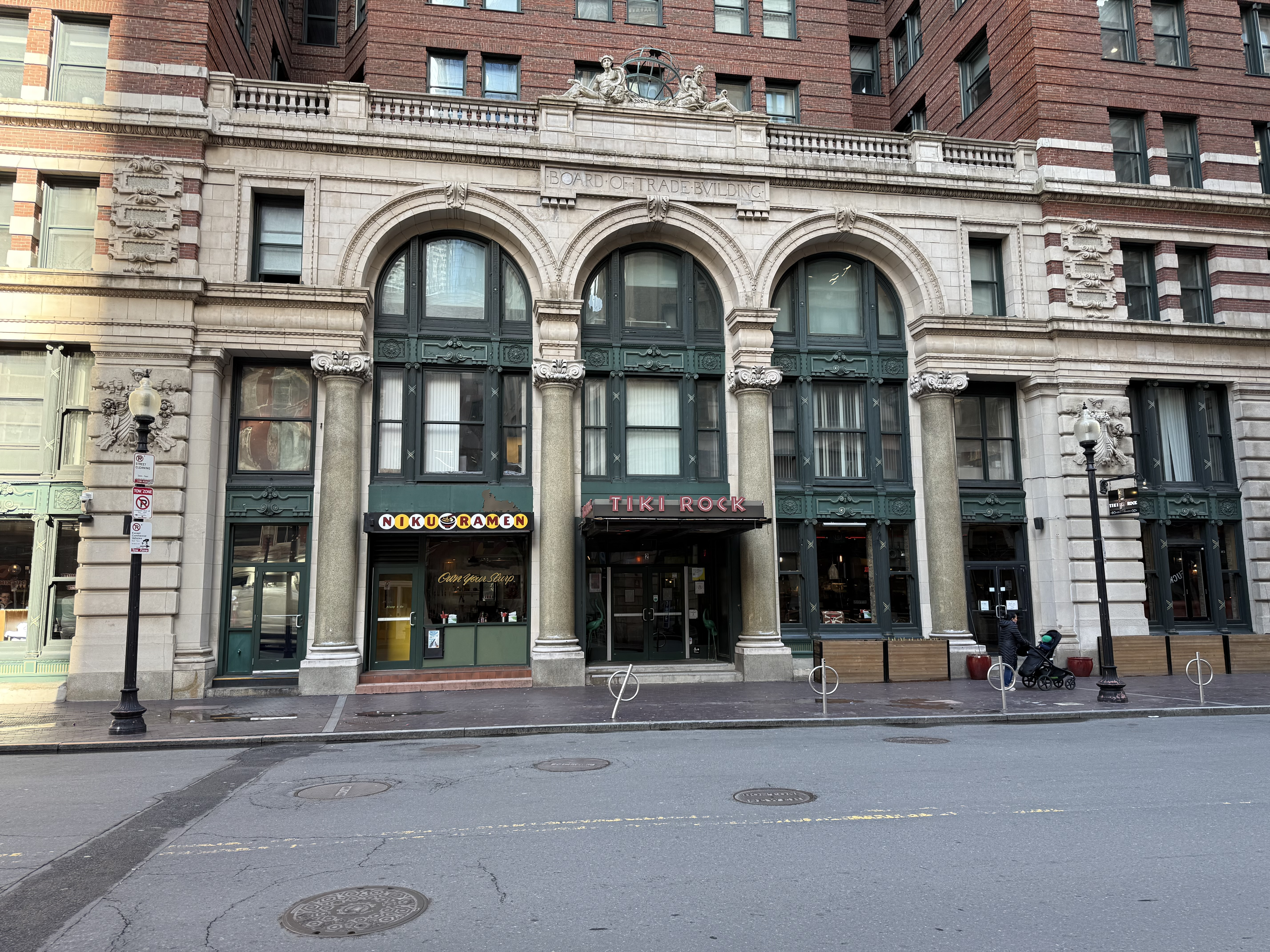
Boston Board of Trade Building

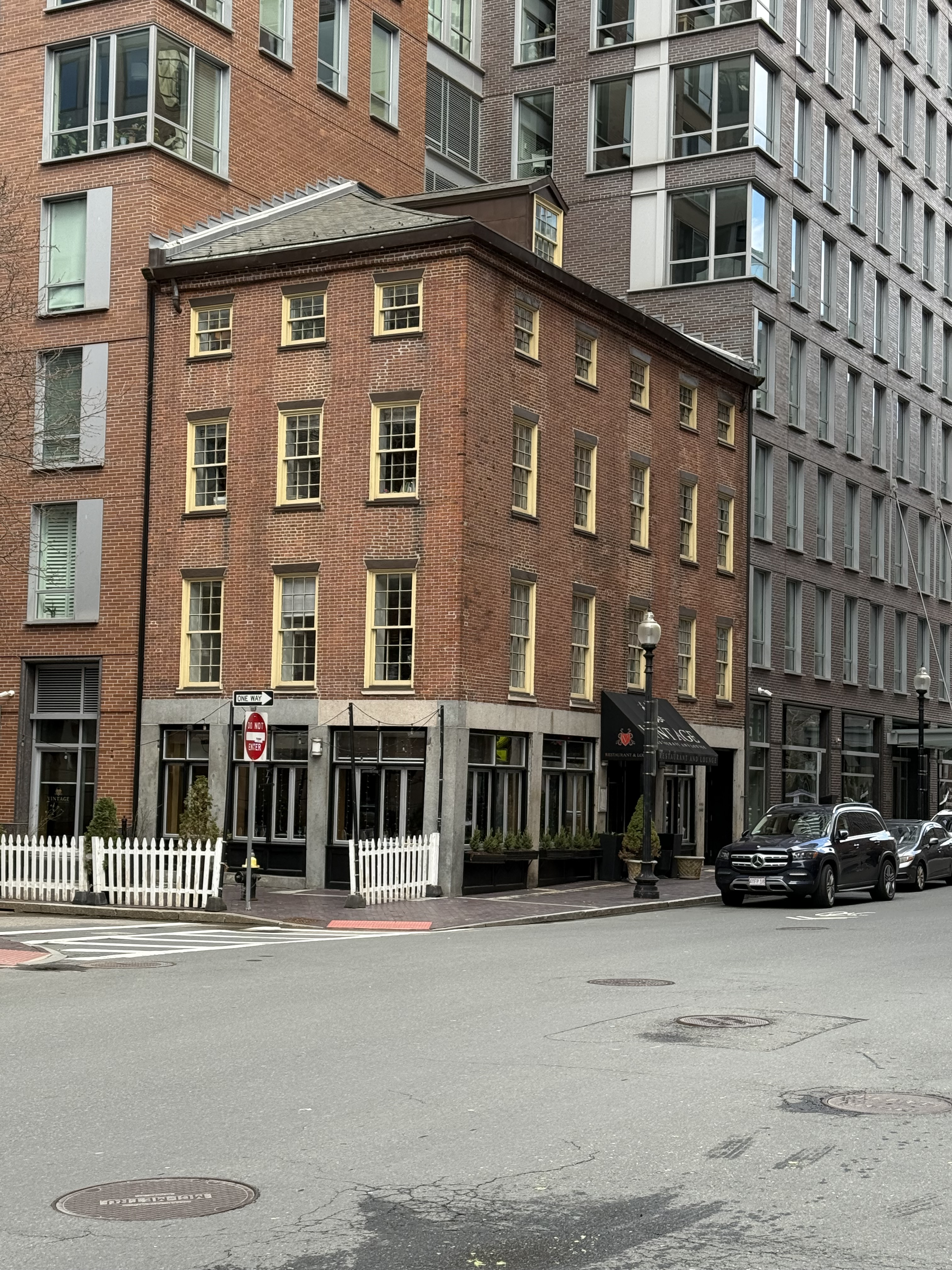
72 Broad Street

- Appleton Building (1900), 4 Liberty Square
- Batterymarch Building (1928), 54–68 Batterymarch Street; designated a Boston Landmark in 1995.
- Board of Trade Building (1901), 2–22 Broad Street
- Boston Custom House (1849) and Custom House Tower (1915), McKinley Square
- Broad Exchange Building (1903), 88 Broad Street
- Broad Street Association warehouses (c. 1805), 5–9, 63–73, 64–70, 72 & 102 Broad Street; designated a Boston Landmark in 1983; 171–175 Milk Street
- Central Wharf warehouses (1816), 146–176 Milk Street
- Chase and Sanborn warehouse (1901), 141–149 Broad Street
- Cunard Building (1901), 122–130 State Street
- Employees Liability Building (1904), 33 Broad Street
- Exchange Club Building (1893), 22 Batterymarch Street
- Farlow Building (1895), 92 State Street
- Fidelity Building (1915), 144–148 State Street
- Flour and Grain Exchange Building, aka Boston Chamber of Commerce (1892), 177 Milk Street
- India Building (1903), 74–84 State Street
- Insurance Exchange Building (1923), 24–44 Broad Street
- King Building (1894), 120–122 Milk Street
- James Codman Building (1873), 44–48 Kilby Street
- John Foster Warehouse (c. 1860), 109–133 Broad Street
- Marshall Building (1910), 15–19 Broad Street
- Pepperell Building (1921), 160 State Street
- Rice Drystuffs Company Building (1872), 295 Franklin Street
- Richards Building, aka Shaw Building (1867), 112–116 State Street
- State Street Block (1857), 177–199 State Street
- Telegraph Building (1903), 100–110 State Street
- William Henderson Boardman Warehouse, aka Howe & French Building (c. 1857), 97–107 Broad Street

== Non-contributing properties (partial listing) ==
- 75 State Street (1988)
- Folio Boston, 88 Broad Street (2005)
- 20 Custom House Street (1988)
- 21 Custom House Street (1989)
- Market Place Center (1985)

== See also ==
- National Register of Historic Places listings in northern Boston, Massachusetts
- Long Wharf and Customhouse Block
- Financial District, Boston
