= American Apollo =

1792–1794 newspaper in Massachusetts, US

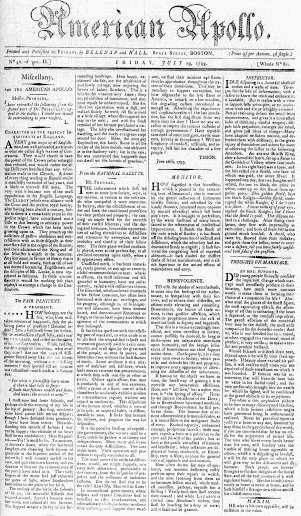
American Apollo July 19, 1793

The American Apollo (January 6, 1792 - December 25, 1794) was a newspaper published in Boston, Massachusetts in the late 18th century, featuring "political and commercial intelligence, and other entertaining matter." It was issued by printer Joseph Belknap, along with Alexander Young (as "Belknap & Young," January–May 1792) and Thomas Hall (as "Belknap & Hall," May 1792-July 1794) on State Street. In 1792, the newly formed Massachusetts Historical Society's "collections were at first published in ... the American Apollo. " The newspaper ceased in December 1794.
