= State Street (Boston) =

Street in Boston, Massachusetts

Coordinates: 42°21′31.96″N 71°3′24.95″W

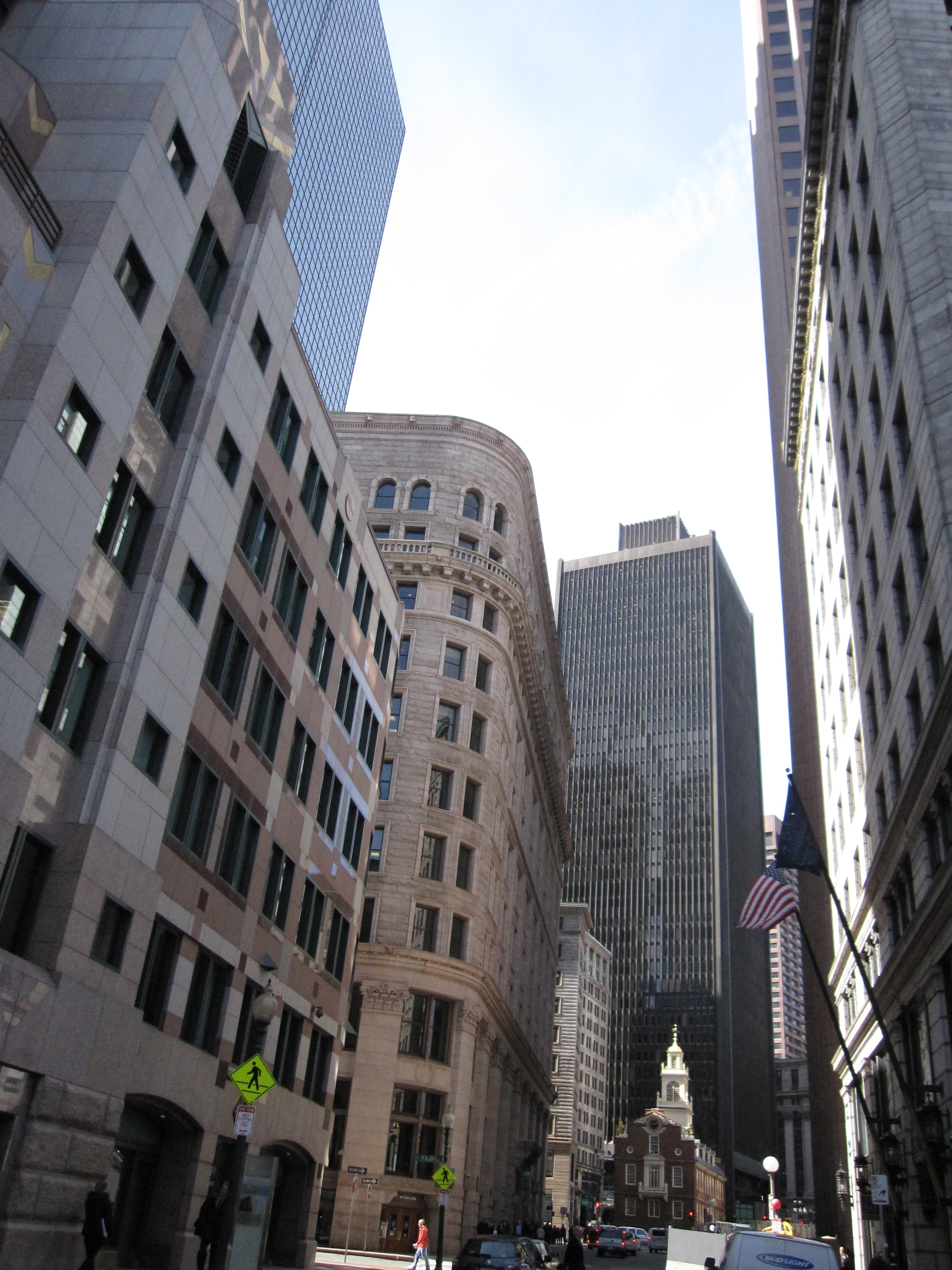
- State Street with view of Old State House in 2010
- Interactive map of State Street
- Former name(s): Market Street; King Street
- West end: Court Street
- Major junctions: Court Street; I-93 (Atlantic Ave./JFK Surface Rd.)
- East end: Old Atlantic Avenue

State Street is one of the oldest and most historic streets in Boston, Massachusetts, United States. Located in the financial district, it is the site of some historic landmarks, such as Long Wharf, the Old State House and the Boston Custom House.

== History ==
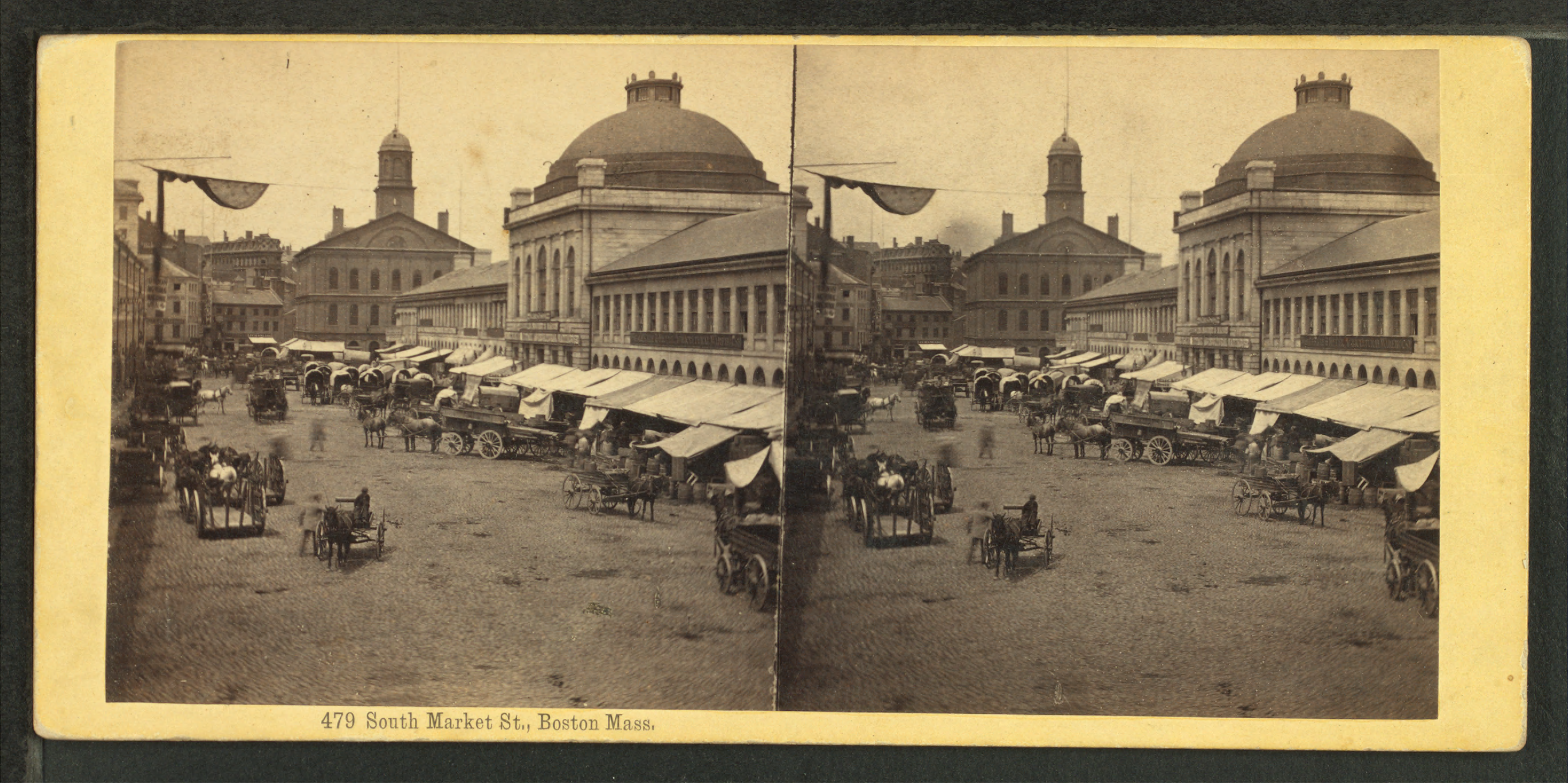
South Market Street, Boston, a stereoscopic photograph by Bierstadt Brothers

In 1630, the first Puritan settlers, led by John Winthrop, built their earliest houses along what is today State Street. The Puritans also originally built the meeting house for the First Church in Boston on the street across from the marketplace, which was located where the Old State House stands today. By 1636 the thoroughfare was known as Market Street. From 1708 to 1784, it was renamed King Street. In 1770 the Boston Massacre took place in front of the Old State House.

During the Revolutionary War, it assumed its current, non-royalist name. In the 19th century State Street became known as Boston's primary location for banks and other financial institutions.

== Transportation ==
The Blue Line of the MBTA subway runs below State Street. Two stations have entrances on State Street: Aquarium and State. The Faneuil Hall Marketplace is also nearby. The east end of State Street is at Long Wharf, where ferries are available to several places, including the airport.

== See also ==
- American Apollo, 18th-century newspaper
- Boston Evening Traveller
- Bunch-of-Grapes, tavern
- First Town-House
- Gilbert & Dean, publishers
- John Mein
- Merchants Exchange
- State Street Block

== Images ==
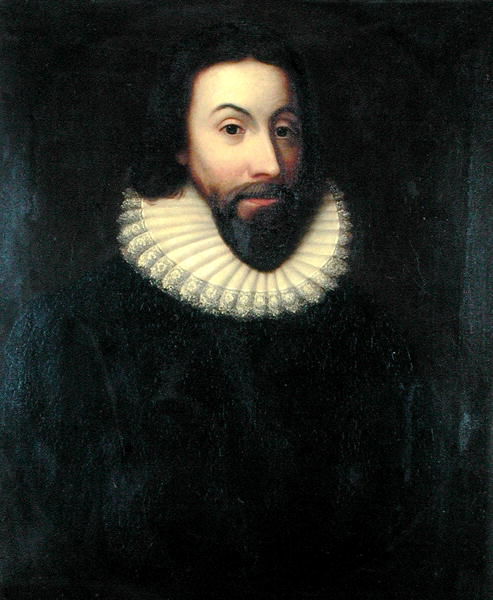
John Winthrop built his first house in Boston on what is today, State Street

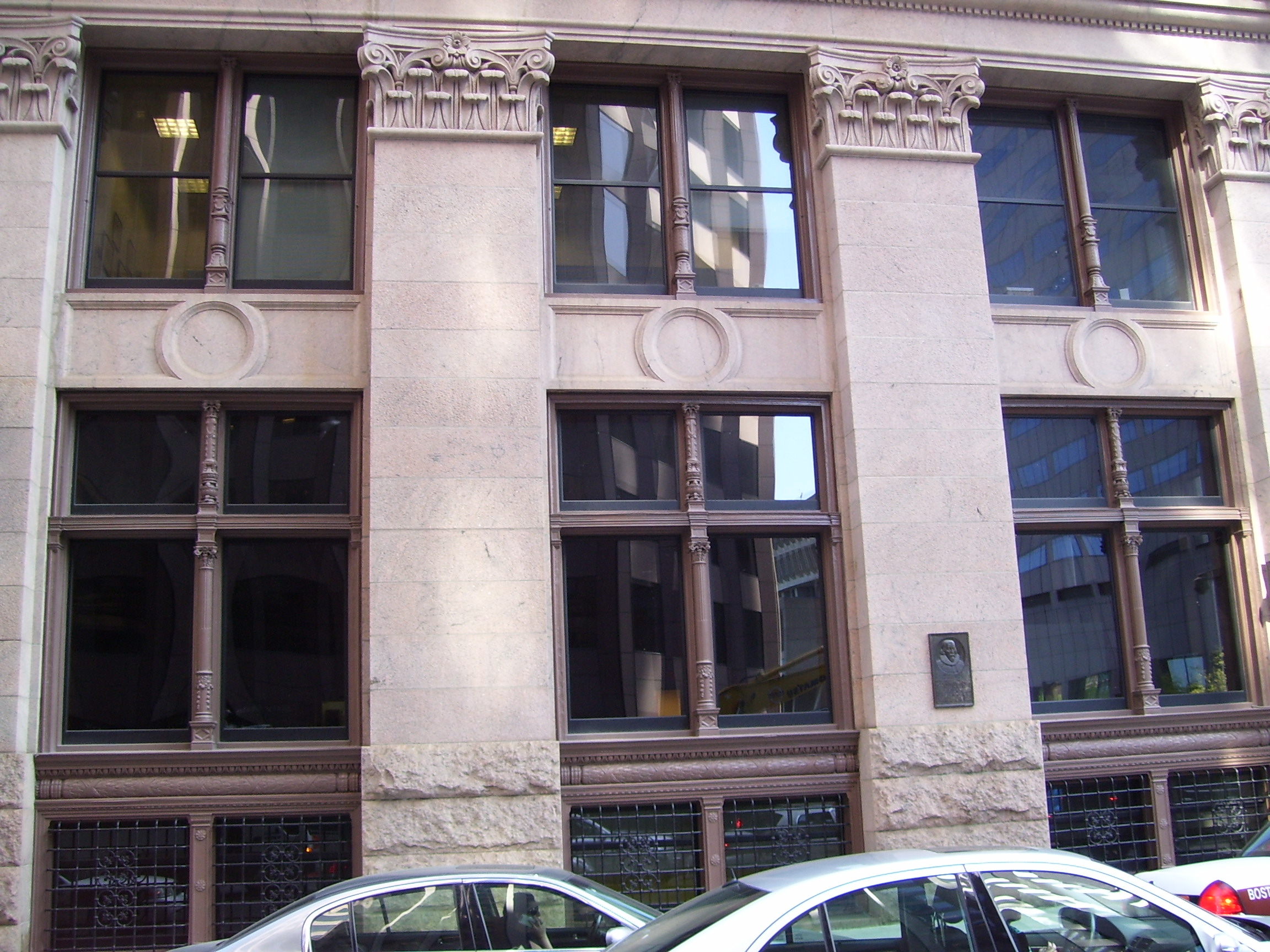
1630 site of Winthrop's first home in Boston on State Street

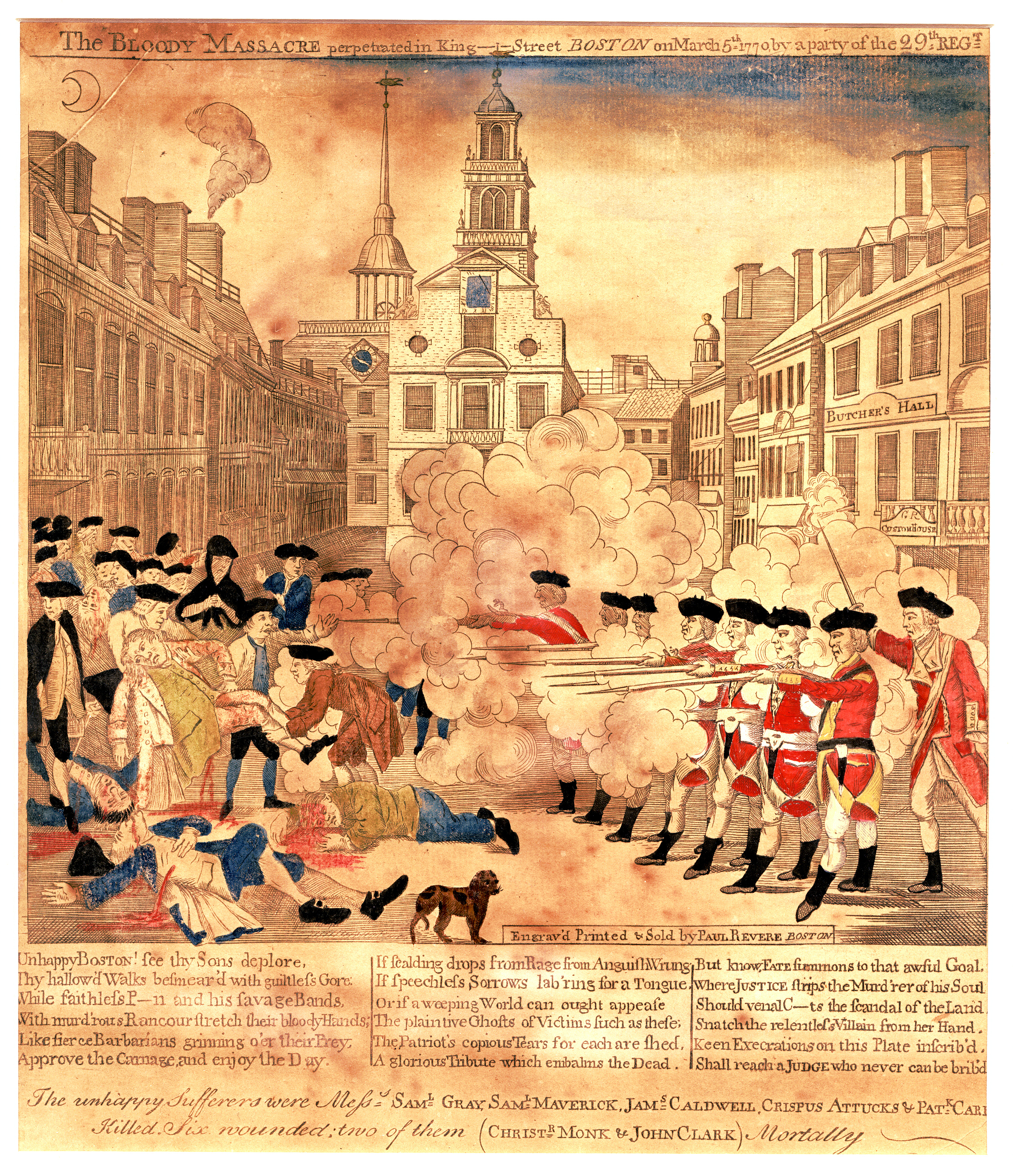
The Boston Massacre took place on State Street (then "King Street") in front of the Old State House; the site is marked by a cobblestone circle in the square

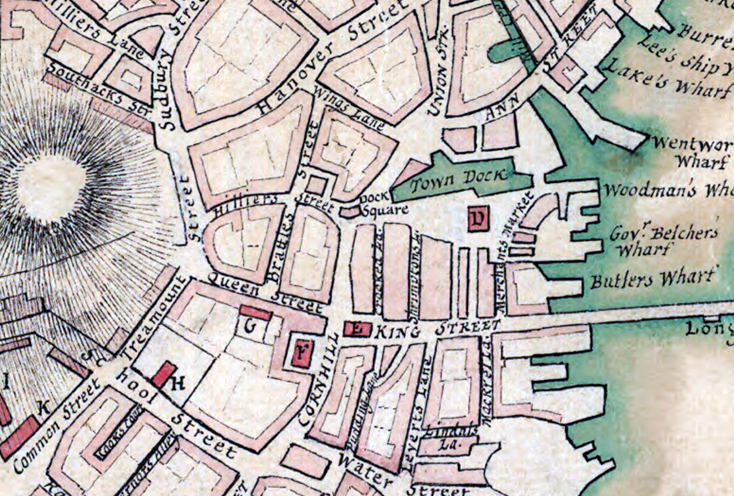
Detail of 1775 map of Boston, showing King Street and vicinity

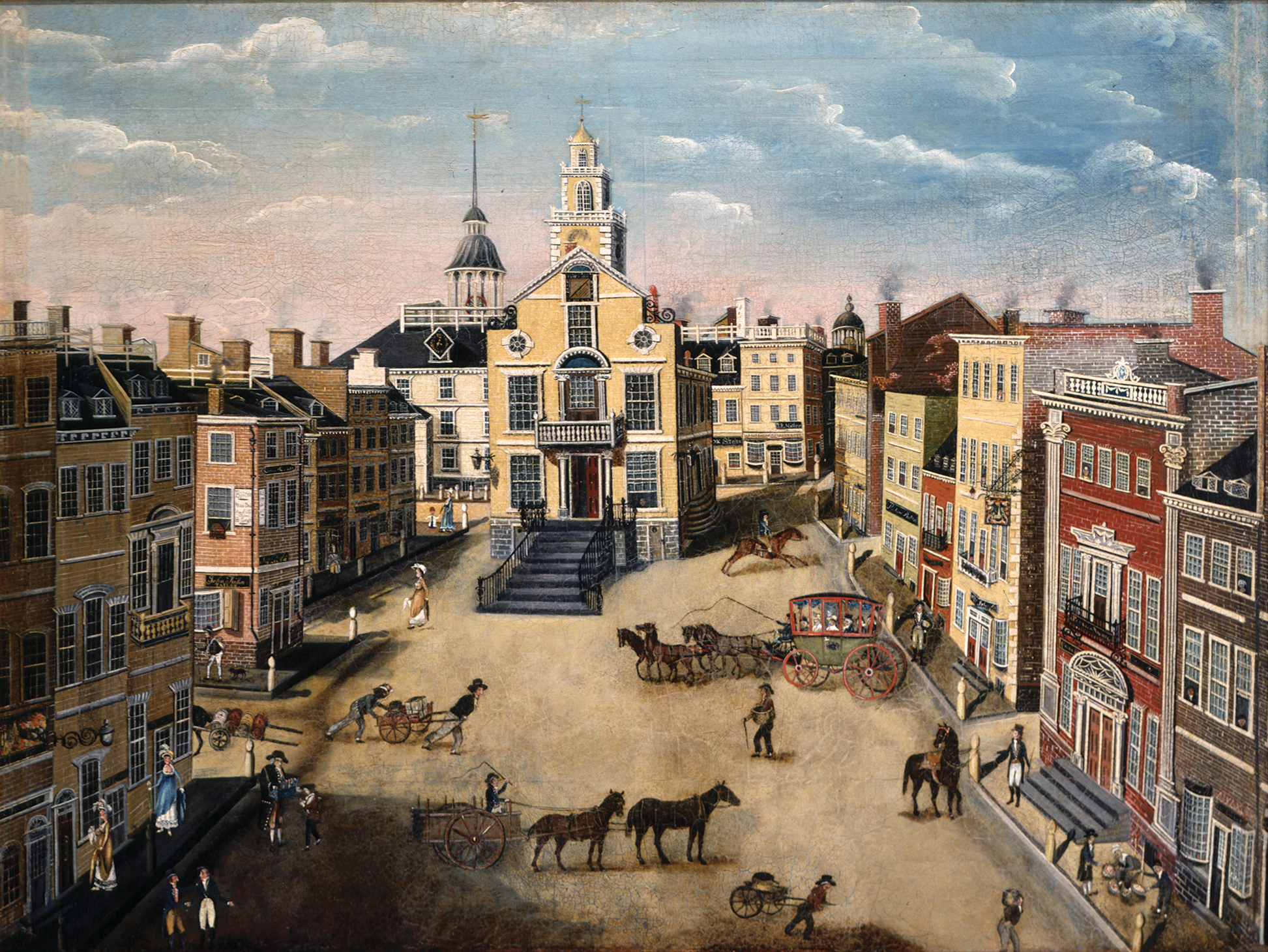
State Street, 1801, by J. Marston

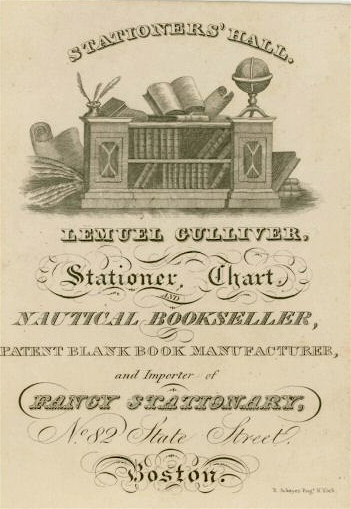
Advertisement for Lemuel Gulliver "stationer, chart and nautical bookseller" c. 1826

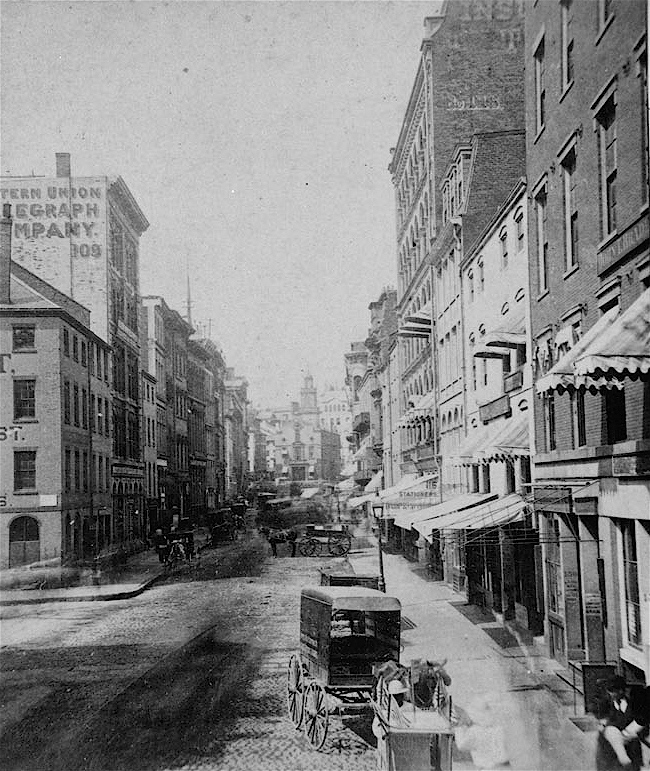
State St., c. 19th century
