= Long Wharf (Boston) =

Historic pier in Boston, Massachusetts

- Long Wharf and Custom House Block
- U.S. National Register of Historic Places
- U.S. National Historic Landmark
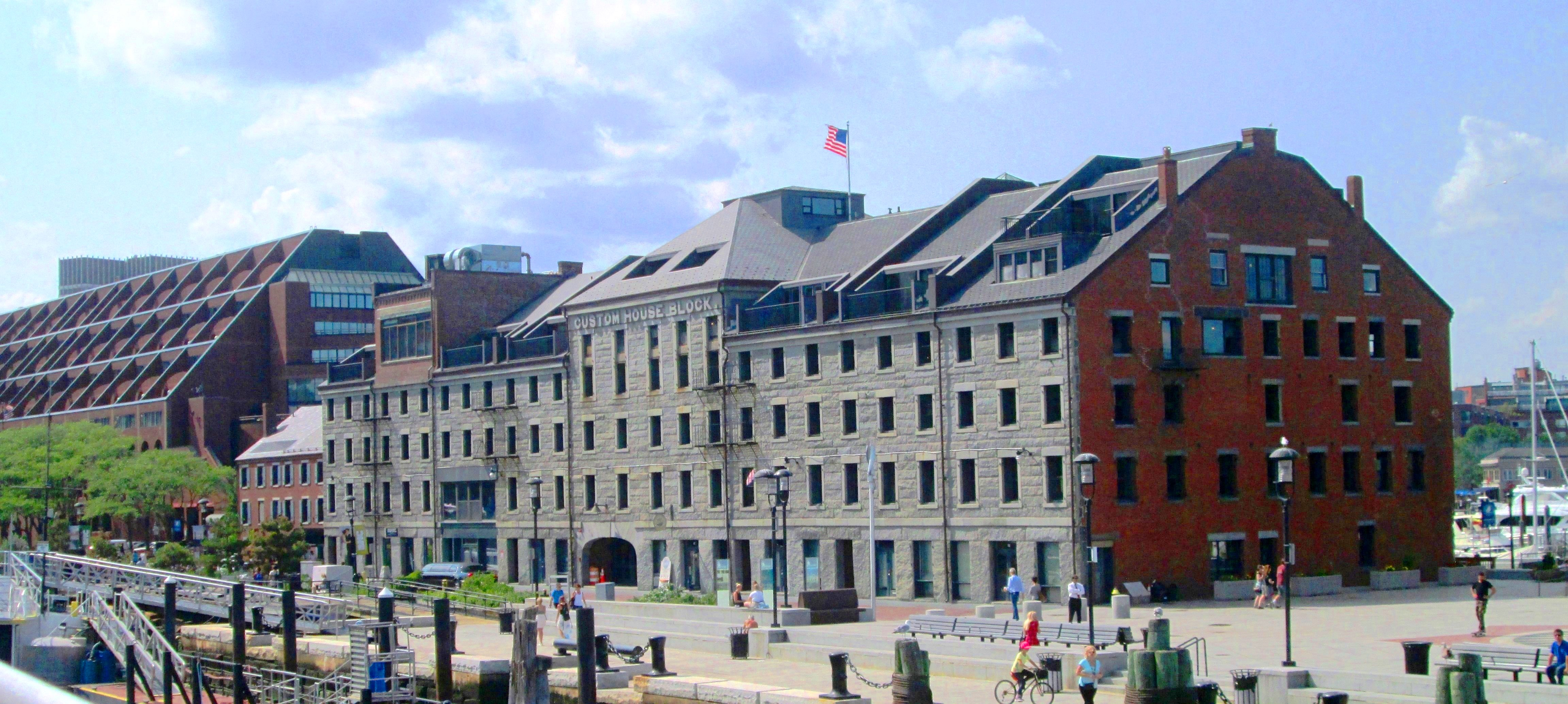
- 2017
- Location: Boston, Massachusetts
- Coordinates: 42°21′37″N 71°2′59″W
- Area: 3 acres (1.2 ha)
- Built: 1710
- NRHP reference No.: 66000768

Significant dates
- Added to NRHP: November 13, 1966
- Designated NHL: November 13, 1966

Long Wharf is a historic pier in Boston, Massachusetts, United States, built between 1710 and 1721. It once extended from State Street nearly a half-mile into Boston Harbor; today, the much-shortened wharf (due to land fill on the city end) functions as a dock for passenger ferries and sightseeing boats.

== History ==
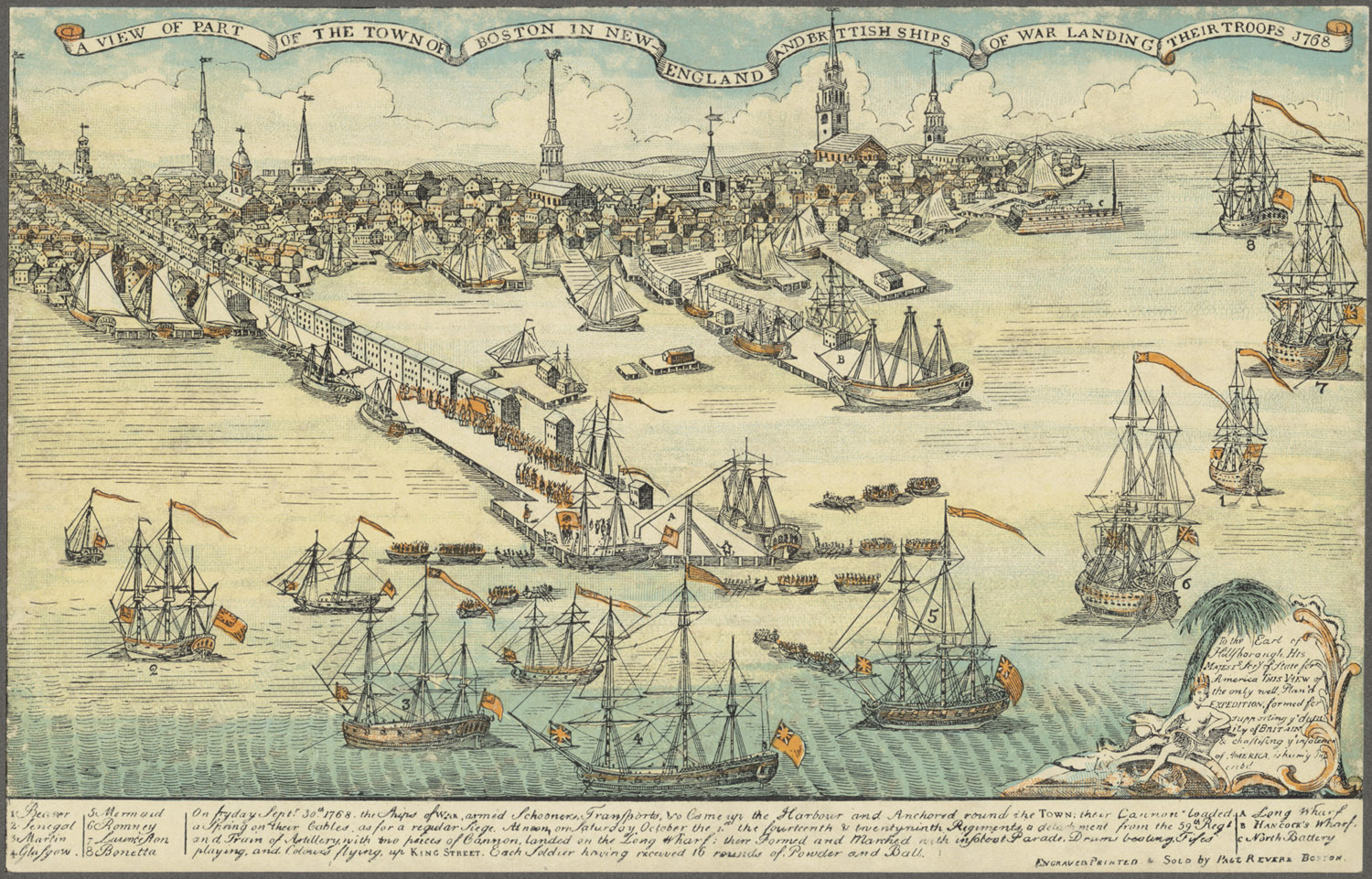
Boston in 1768, with Long Wharf extending into the harbor. Engraving by Paul Revere.

=== 18th century ===
Construction of the wharf began around 1710. As originally built the wharf extended from the shoreline adjacent to Faneuil Hall and was one-third of a mile long, thrusting considerably farther than other wharves into deep water and thus allowing larger ships to tie up and unload directly to new warehouses and stores. "Constructed by Captain Oliver Noyes, it was lined with warehouses and served as the focus of Boston's great harbor." Over time the water areas surrounding the landward end of the wharf were reclaimed, including the areas now occupied by Quincy Market and the Custom House.

"At the wharf's head in the 18th century was the Bunch-of-Grapes Tavern. The painter John Singleton Copley spent his childhood on the wharf, where his mother had a tobacco shop." The 1760s Gardiner Building, once home to John Hancock's counting house and now a Chart House restaurant, is the wharf's oldest surviving structure.

=== 19th century ===
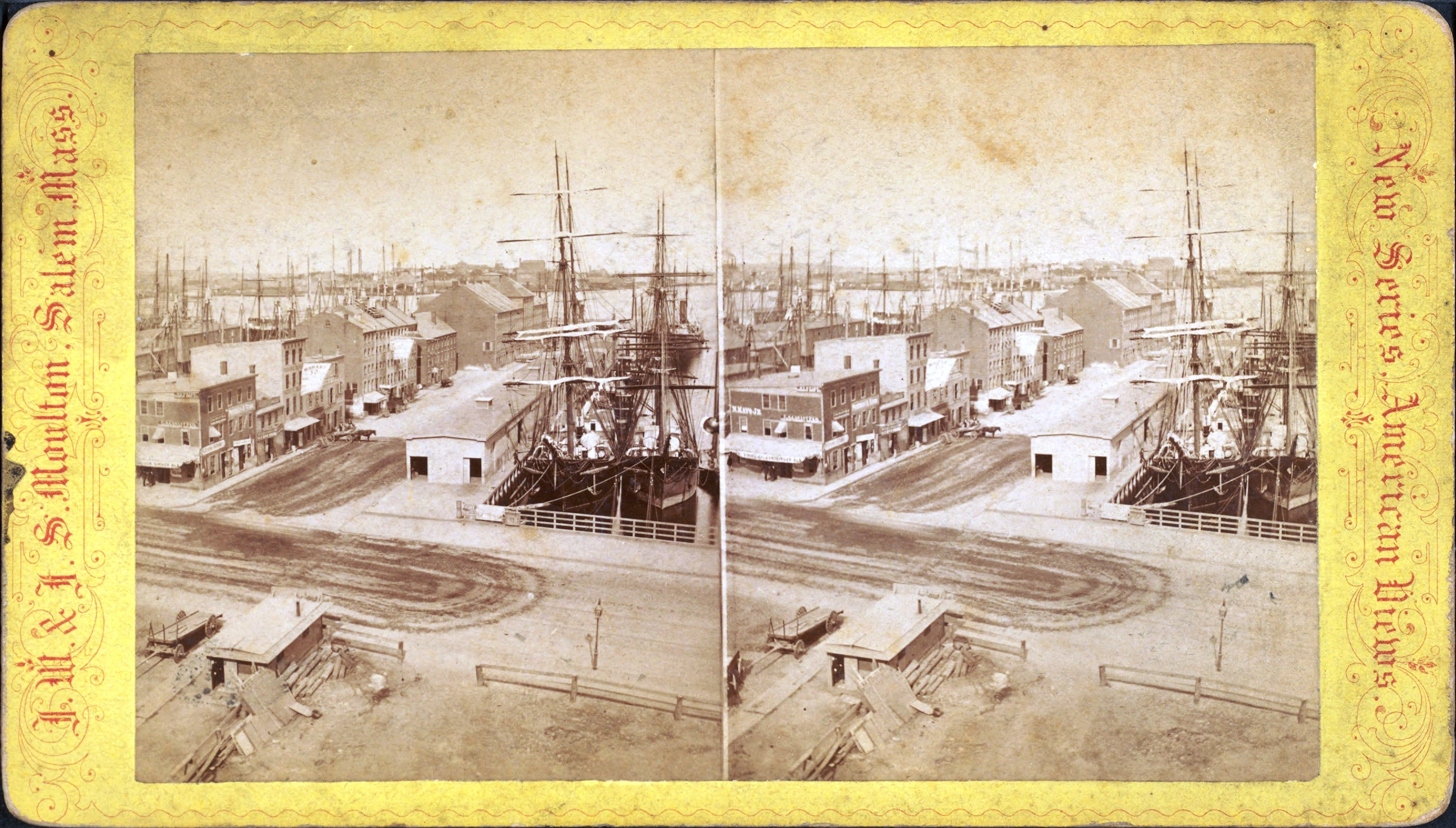
Long Wharf, c.19th century

Among several similar structures, a grand granite warehouse known as the Custom House Block was built in 1848 atop the wharf; it has survived into the 21st century. The mid-19th century was the height of Boston's importance as a shipping center, lasting roughly until the American Civil War. Long Wharf was the central focus of much of this economic activity.

In the late 1860s, as the city's port began to decline in importance as an international shipping destination, Atlantic Avenue was cut through this and other wharves, changing the face of the waterfront.

=== 20th century ===
The construction of the elevated Central Artery along Atlantic Avenue in the 1950s separated Long Wharf from Boston's business district.

The wharf and the 19th-century Custom House Block were recognized as a National Historic Landmark in recognition for the role they played in the history of Boston and its importance as a major 19th-century shipping center.

=== 21st century ===
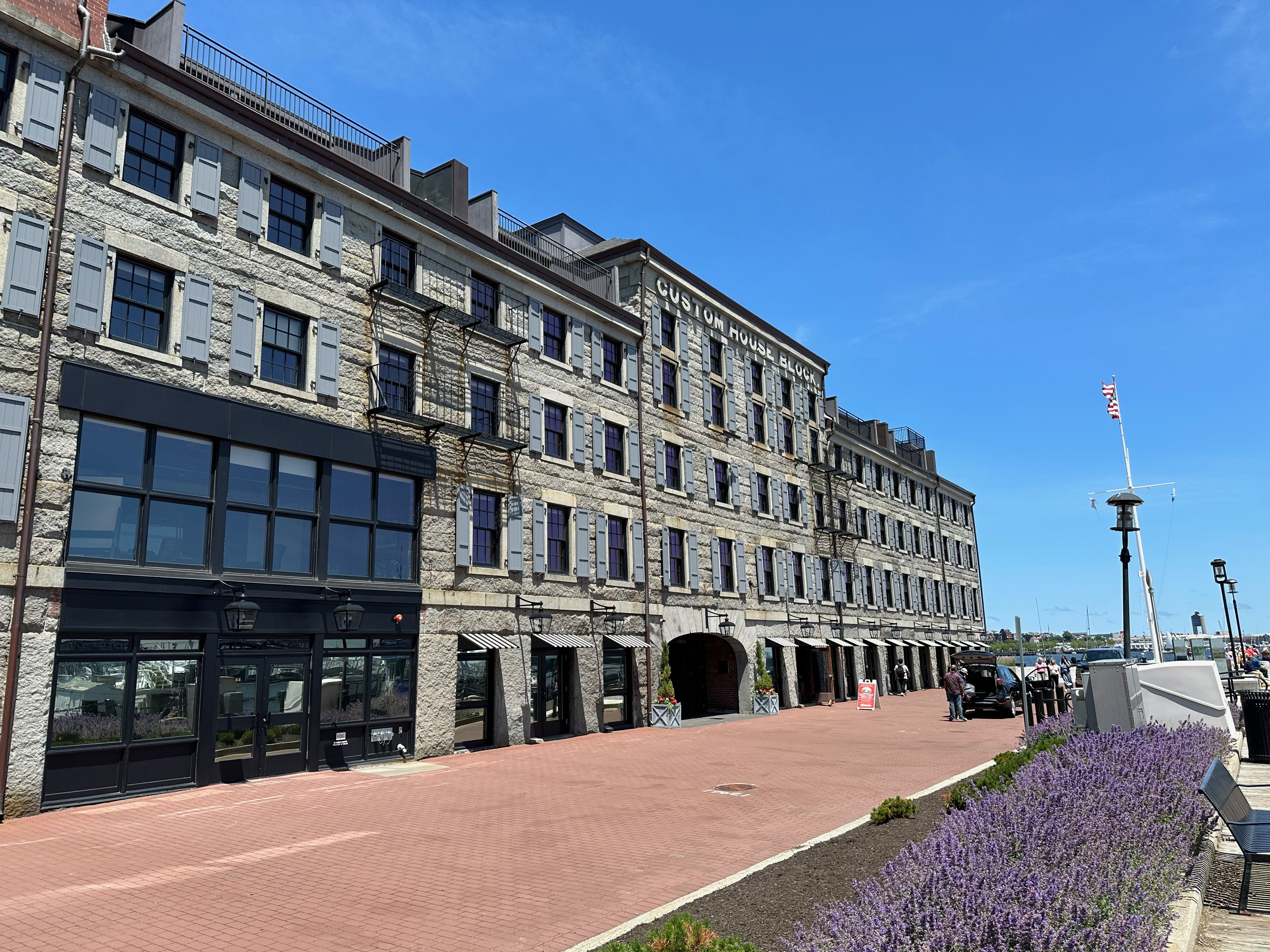
Custom House Block, 2023

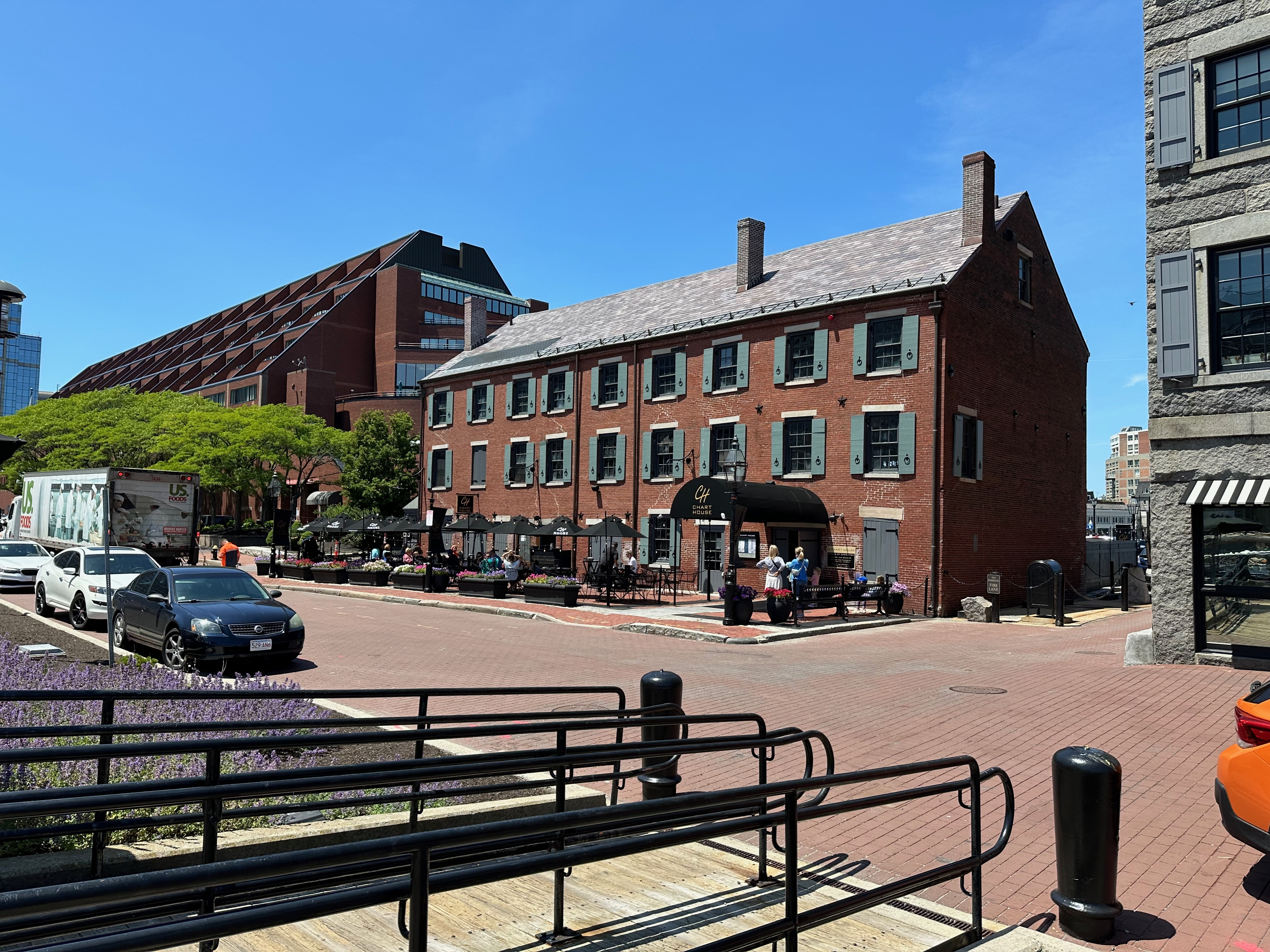
Gardiner Building, 2023, with the Boston Marriott Long Wharf behind it to the west

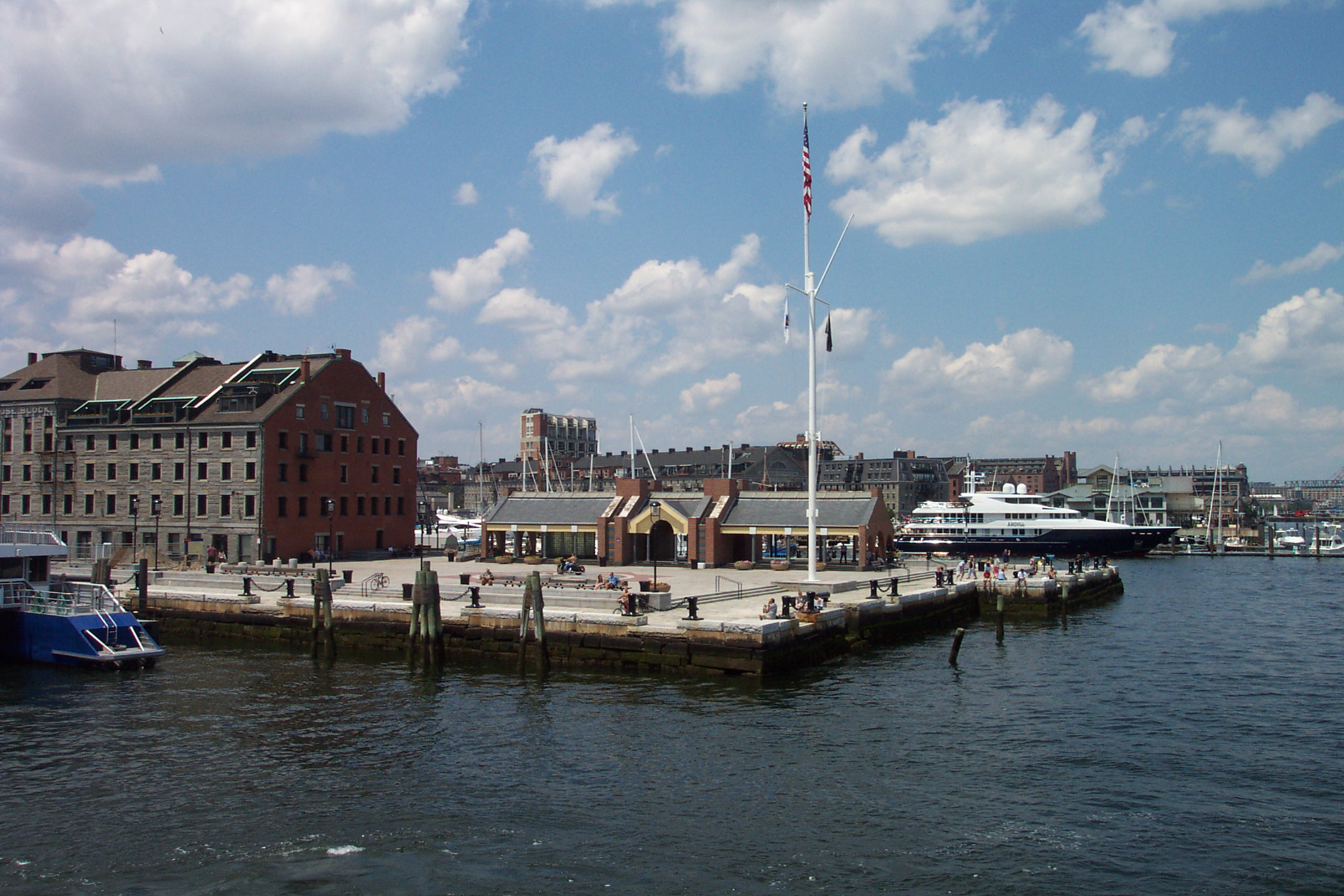
Viewing plaza at end of the wharf

The Big Dig put the Central Artery below ground level, which partially restored the original close relationship between Long Wharf and downtown. Since ca.1990, Long Wharf has been transformed from a failing commercial waterfront area into a recreational and cultural center.

Today, Long Wharf is adjacent to the New England Aquarium, and is served by the Aquarium station on MBTA's Blue Line subway. MBTA ferry service links the wharf to the Boston Navy Yard in Charlestown, Logan International Airport, Hull, and Quincy. Other passenger ferry services operate to the islands of the Boston Harbor Islands National Recreation Area, and to the cities of Salem and Provincetown. Cruise boats operate various cruises around the harbour. The wharf itself is occupied by a hotel, several restaurants and shops. At the seaward end, there is a large plaza with extensive views of the harbor. Now much shortened by land reclamation at its landward end, today it serves as the principal terminus for cruise boats and harbor ferries operating on Boston Harbor.

== Custom House Block ==
The Custom House Block (42°21′35.95″N 71°2′58.53″W) was built in 1845-87. A former warehouse, the four-story building was designed by architect Isaiah Rogers and constructed of granite and brick. In its 19th-century heyday, it contributed to the life of "Boston's busiest pier, commercial port, and embarkation point for travelers." Today private owners maintain the site.

The building was renovated in 1973 by Anderson Notter Associates.

== Gardiner Building ==
The Gardiner Building (42.360°N 71.050°W) is a brick Colonial style warehouse built in 1763 and rebuilt in 1812. At one time it was used as John Hancock's counting house. Long Wharf was once filled with this kind of building, but this is the only one remaining; it is the wharf's oldest surviving structure. The building was renovated in 1973 by Anderson Notter Associates. It is currently the restaurant Chart House.

The Gardiner Building features a slate roof and "six-over-six" windows with shutters. The lintels and sills are granite.

== Services ==
The following marine services operate from Long Wharf:

- MBTA ferry (north side and south side)
- Ferries to the Boston Harbor Islands National Recreation Area (north side)
- Ferry to Salem, Massachusetts (north side)
- Ferry to Provincetown, Massachusetts
- Water taxi
- New England Aquarium harbor tours (south side) – Aquarium itself is on Central Wharf to the immediate south
- Various harbor cruises
- Docks for private vessels

== See also ==
- Boston Marriott Long Wharf, 6 Long Wharf
- Custom House District, area near Long Wharf
- State Street Block, built 1857 on State Street
- National Register of Historic Places listings in northern Boston, Massachusetts
- List of National Historic Landmarks in Boston
