= State Street Block (Boston) =

- U.S. Historic district – Contributing property
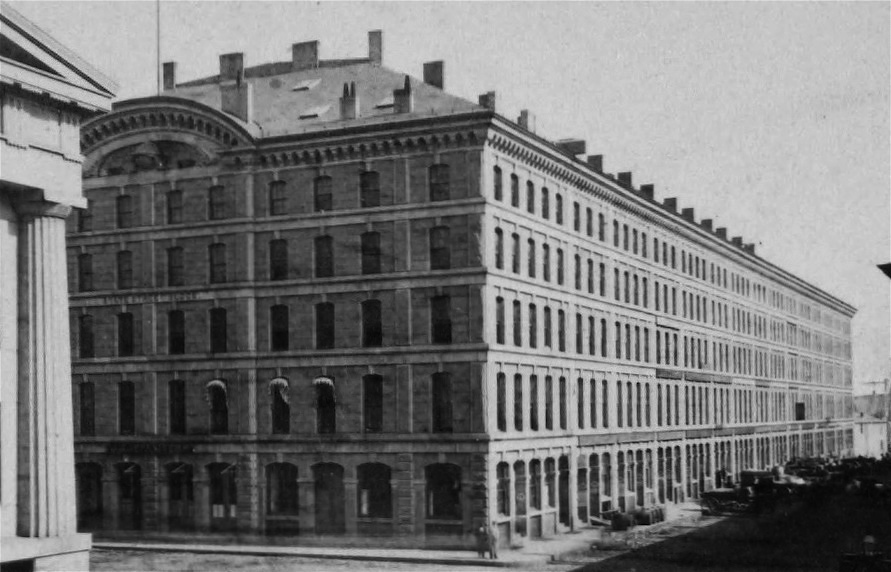
- State Street Block, Boston, ca. 19th c. (Custom House at left edge)
- Location: 177-199 State Street; Boston, Massachusetts
- Coordinates: 42°21′33.38″N 71°3′10.27″W
- Built: 1858
- Architect: Gridley James Fox Bryant
- Architectural style: Italianate
- Part of: Custom House District (ID73000321)
- Designated CP: May 11, 1973

State Street Block (built 1857) is a granite building near the waterfront in the Financial District of Boston, Massachusetts. Architect Gridley James Fox Bryant designed it. In the 1850s "the Long and Central Wharf Corporation ... sold each bay to individual owners, requiring that 'the granite to be used for the sidewalk & facade of each bay must be purchased from the Corporation & erected according to the architect's plan.'"

Walt Whitman visited Boston in 1860, and wrote about what he saw: "Noblest of all State Street Block, east of the Custom House, rough granite. The above probably one of the finest pieces of com[merical] architecture in the world." Another visitor travelling through Boston (in 1859) called it "a magnificent block."

In the mid-20th century, "nearly three-quarters of the original 22-bay building ... was amputated for construction of the Central Artery ... and the roofline of the remainder has been destroyed." The surviving portion of the block was added as part of the Custom House District to the National Register of Historic Places in 1973.

== Images ==
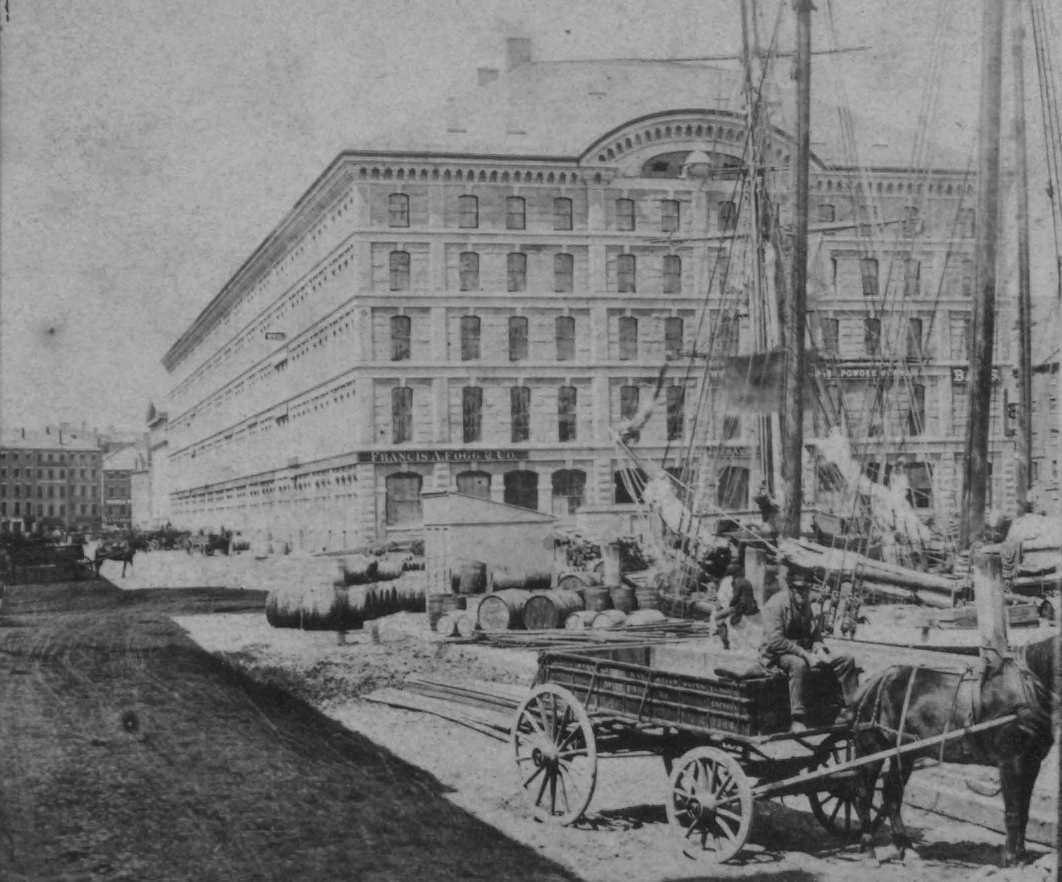
State St. Block, ca.19th c., looking from waterfront

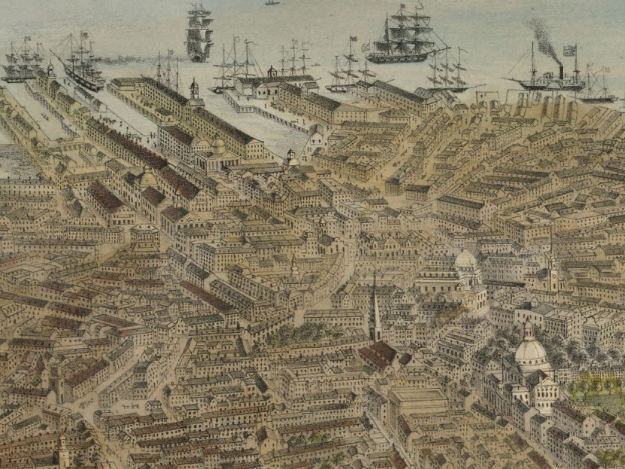
Detail of 1870 overview of Boston, showing Custom House, and State Street Block at waterfront

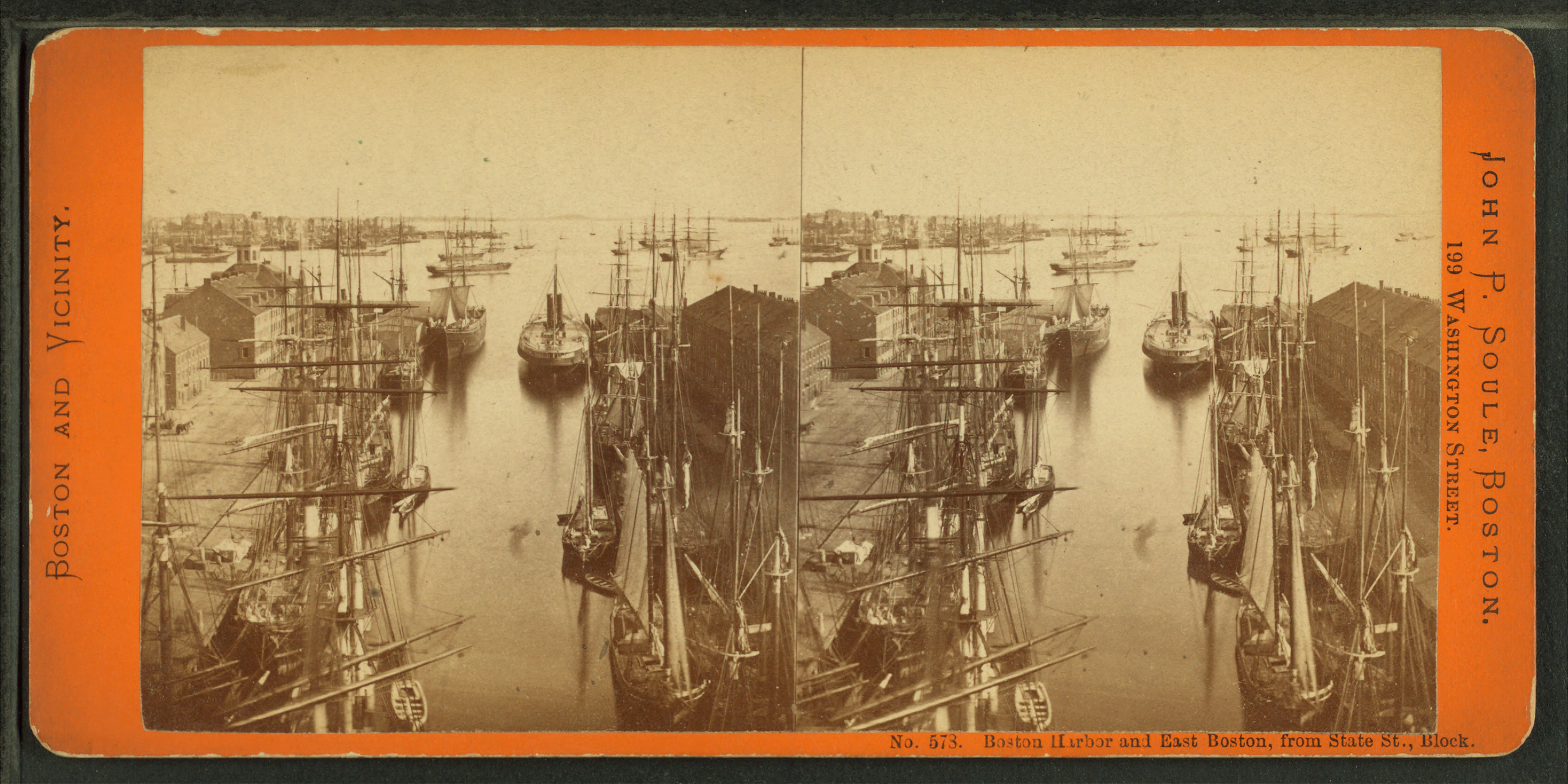
The view of Boston Harbor from State Street Block, ca.19th c.

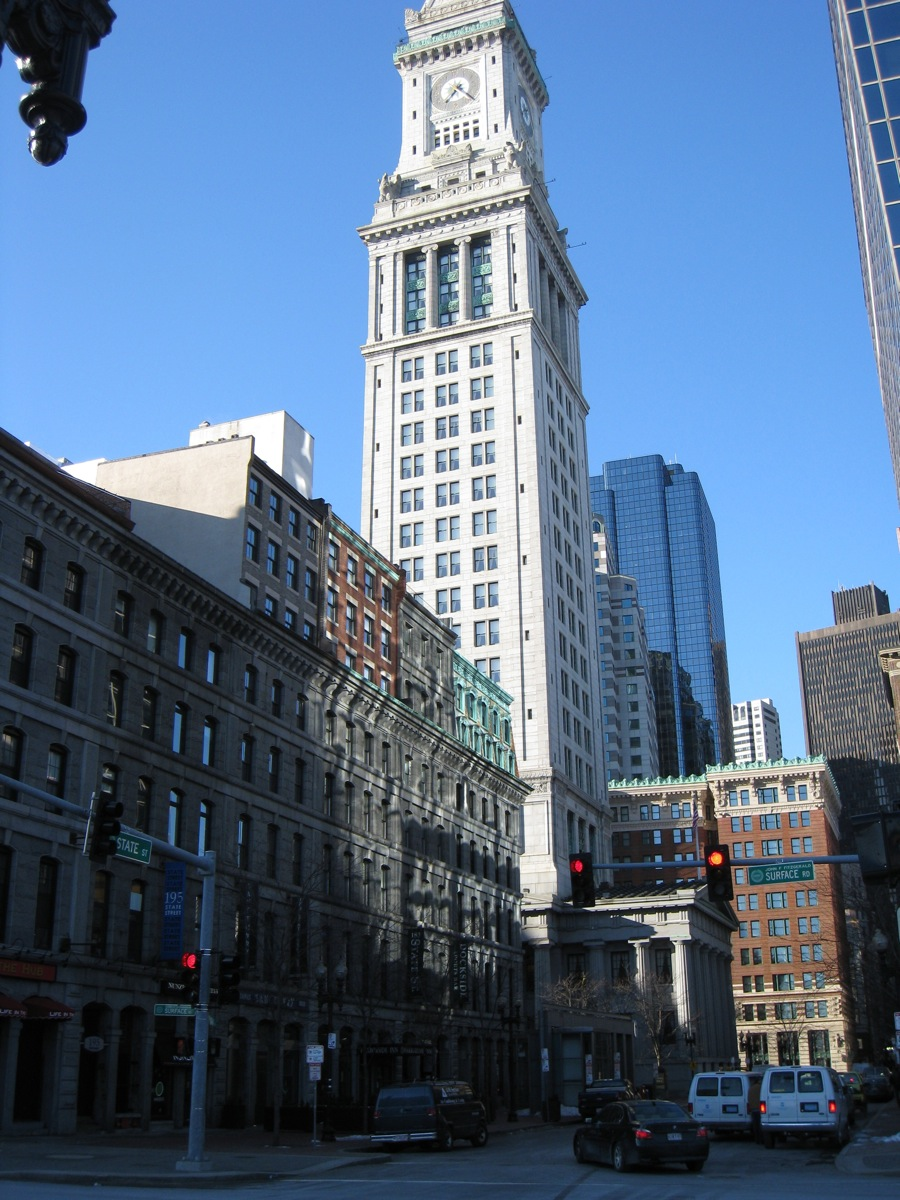
State Street and State Street Block, 2008

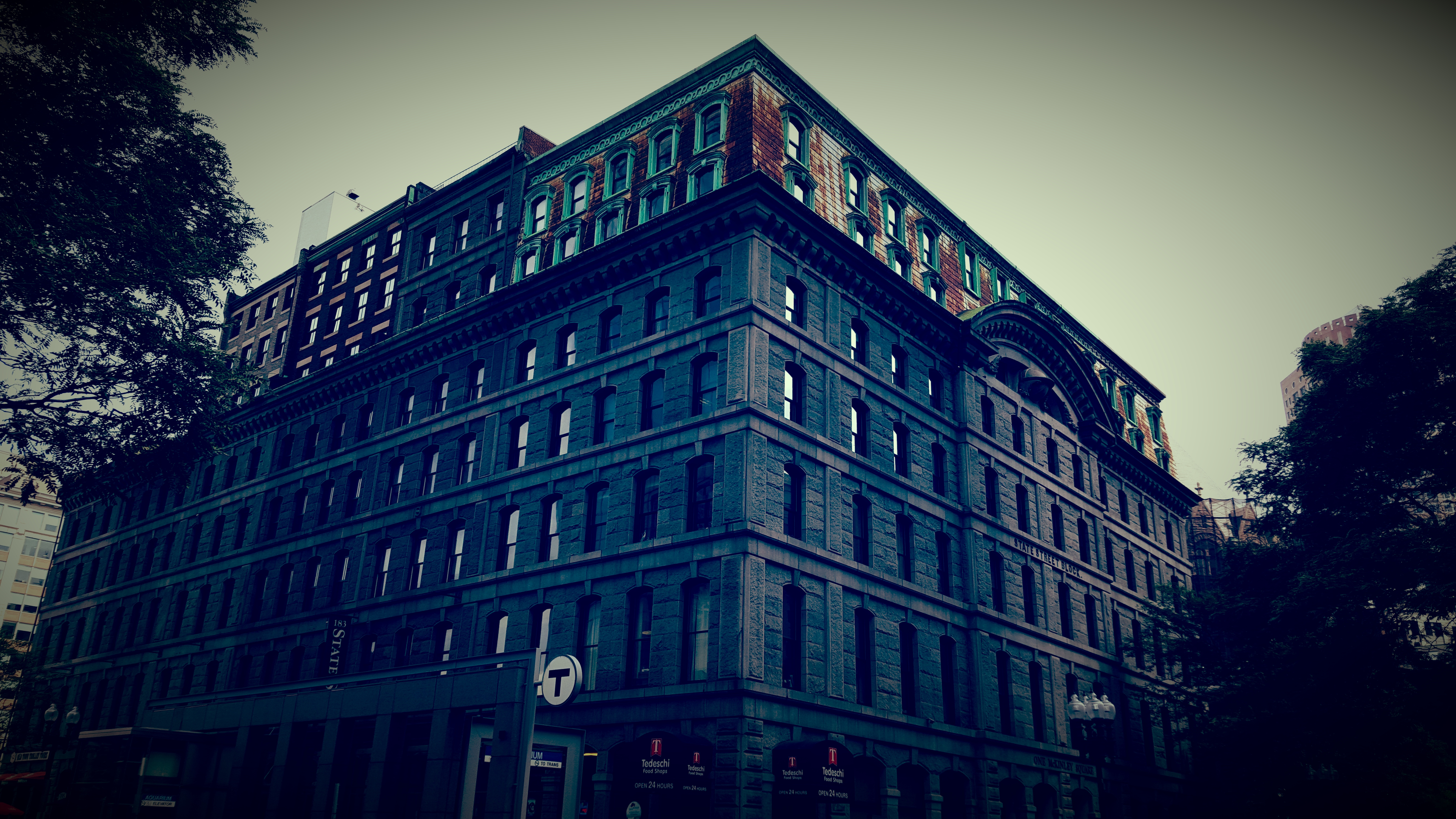
State Street Block, 2015
