= MV Lady Martha =

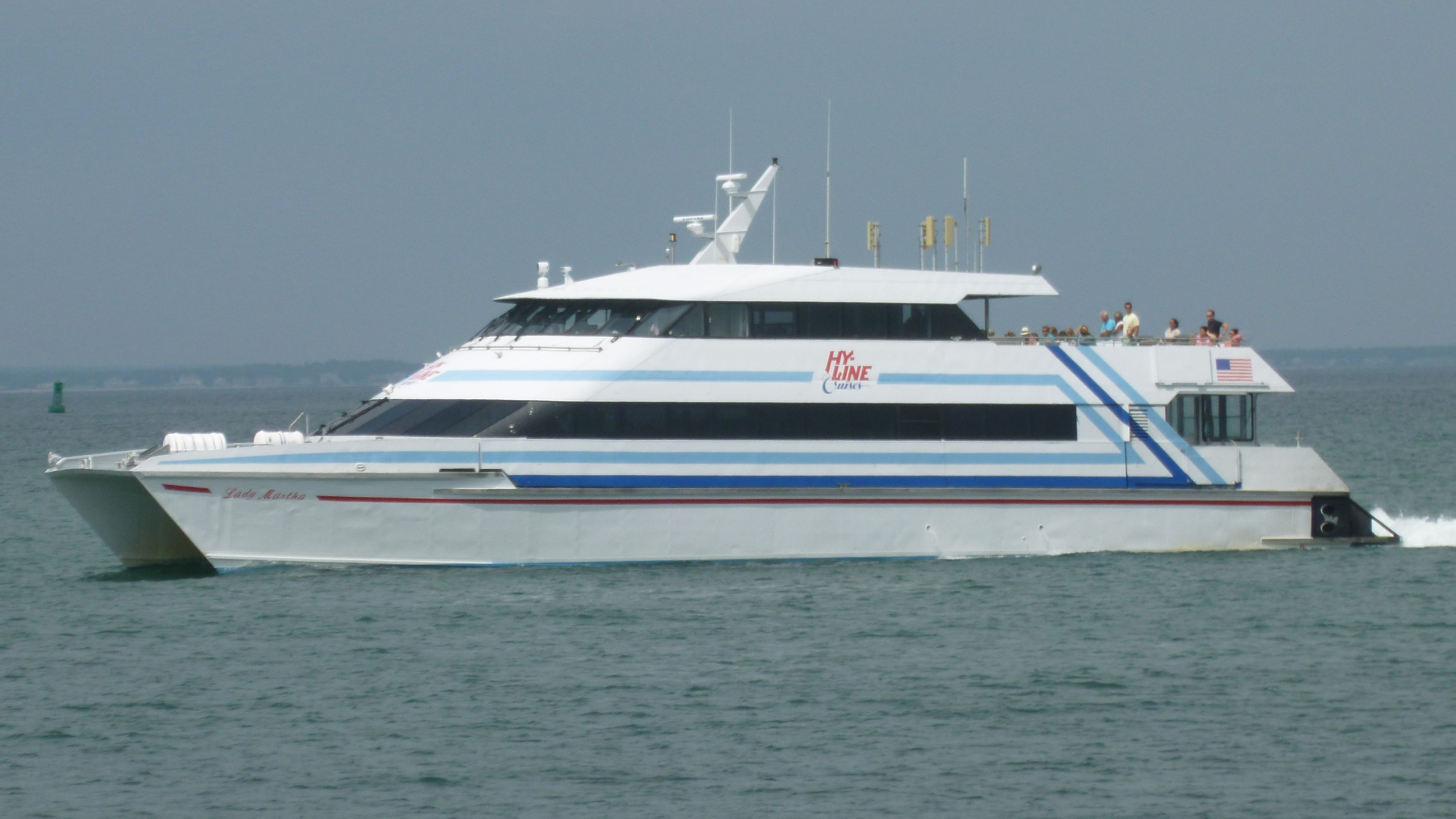
- Lady Martha seen in 2014.

History

United States
- Name: Grey Lady II (1997-2005); Lady Martha (2005-Present)
- Owner: Hyannis Harbor Tours Inc.
- Builder: Gladding-Hearn Shipbuilding
- Yard number: P-310
- Completed: 1997
- Home port: Hyannis, Massachusetts
- Identification: IMO number: 8994116; MMSI number: 366740280; USCG Doc. No.: 1058496; Callsign: WCX8181
- Status: In service

General characteristics
- Type: Fast ferry
- Tonnage: 257 gt
- Length: 96 feet (29 m)
- Beam: 30 feet (9.1 m)
- Draft: 10 feet (3.0 m)

MV Lady Martha is a high speed catamaran ferry operated by Hy-Line Cruises out of Hyannis, Massachusetts.

Lady Martha was built by Gladding-Hearn Shipbuilding and was delivered as Grey Lady II in 1997, the second vessel of the name to operate for Hy-Line between Hyannis and Nantucket Island. She remained in this service until 2003, when she was replaced by MV Grey Lady. She was leased to an operator on the US West Coast for several years before returning to Hy-Line in 2005 to operate between Hyannis and Oak Bluffs on Martha's Vineyard, receiving interior modifications and new engines before entering service.
