= MV East Chop =

History

United States
- Name: East Chop
- Namesake: East Chop
- Operator: Hy-Line Cruises
- Ordered: 1970
- Launched: 1971
- In service: 1971
- Status: in active service, as of 2012

General characteristics
- Length: 100 ft (30 m) o/a
- Beam: 40 ft (12 m)
- Propulsion: 2 diesel engines

MV East Chop is a ferry in Massachusetts that operates between Hyannis and the islands of Martha's Vineyard and Nantucket.

She measures 100 ft (30 m) in length overall and 40 ft (12 m) in beam. She is powered by two diesel engines which drive two propellers.

She was purchased by Hy-Line Cruises in 1970 and is marketed with the name "Around the Sound". She derives her name from East Chop, a residential area of the Town of Oak Bluffs on Martha's Vineyard.
