= Seastreak =

Private ferry company in New York and New Jersey

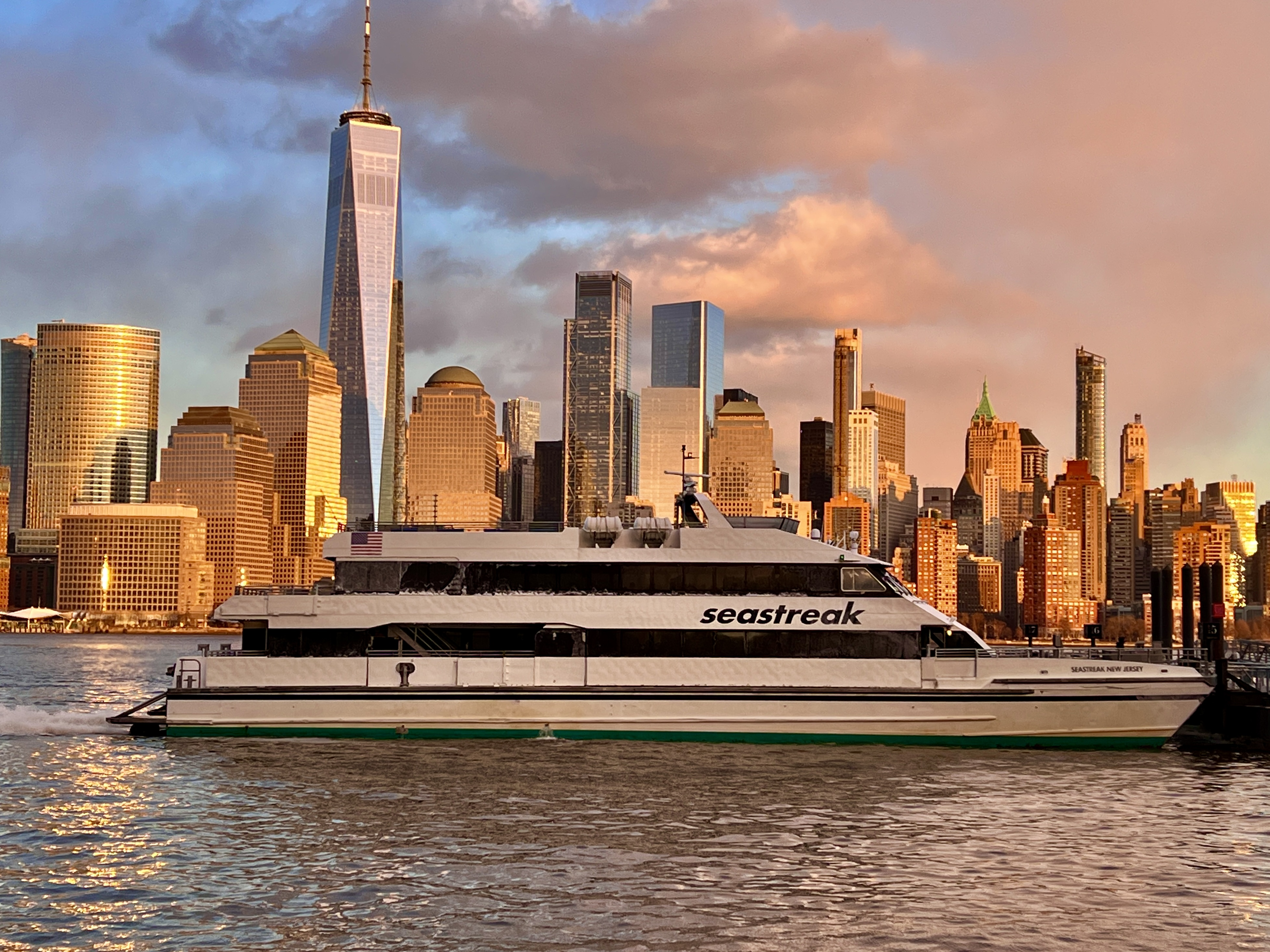
- Locale: New Jersey; New York
- Waterway: Hudson River; East River; New York Bay
- Transit type: Passenger ferry Excursions; Sightseeing
- Owner: Seastreak LLC
- Began operation: 1986
- No. of lines: 2
- No. of vessels: 10
- No. of terminals: 8
- Daily ridership: 2,506 (daily average, March 2023)
- Website: seastreak.com

Seastreak is a private ferry company operating in the Port of New York and New Jersey and in New England. It provides high-speed commuter service between points on the Raritan Bayshore in Monmouth County, New Jersey and in Manhattan in New York City as well as special event and sightseeing excursions in the harbor and seasonal service to the New England coast.

== History ==
Seastreak began operation in 1986 as TNT Hydrolines, a subsidiary of TNT of Australia operating commuter ferry services between New Jersey and New York City.

In 1994 all of TNT's maritime assets were acquired by Holyman of Australia and the ferry service name was changed to Express Navigation. In 1999 Sea Containers acquired Express Navigation. The company was renamed Seastreak. Following Sea Containers filing for bankruptcy in 2006, Seastreak was sold to New England Fast Ferry in 2008.

== Vessels ==
Seastreak Fleet
| Name | Owner | Length | Passenger capacity | Top speed | Builder | Propulsion | Entered service | Routes operated | Notes |
|---|---|---|---|---|---|---|---|---|---|
| Nantucket Express | Seastreak | 141 ft. | 505 | 38 knots (44 mph) | Gladding-Hearn Shipbuilding, Somerset, MA | Servogear CPP propellers | 2003 as "Seastreak Wall Street"/2012 Repowered and Renamed "Nantucket Express" | New Bedford–Martha's Vineyard/Nantucket | |
| Seastreak Highlands | Seastreak | 141 ft. | 505 | 38 knots (44 mph) | Gladding-Hearn Shipbuilding, Somerset, MA | High-speed water jets | 2004 | New Jersey-New York | |
| Seastreak New Jersey | Seastreak | 141 ft. | 505 | 38 knots (44 mph) | Gladding-Hearn Shipbuilding, Somerset, MA | High-speed water jets | 2001 | New Jersey-New York | |
| Seastreak New York | Seastreak | 141 ft. | 505 | 38 knots (44 mph) | Gladding-Hearn Shipbuilding, Somerset, MA | High-speed water jets | 2001 | New Jersey-New York | |
| Ocean State | New England Fast Ferry | 95 ft. | 149 | 29 knots (33 mph) | Merrifield-Roberts, Bristol, RI | ZF propellers | 2003 | Providence–Newport | |
| Martha's Vineyard Express | New England Fast Ferry | 95 ft. | 149 | 29 knots (33 mph) | Derecktor Shipyards, Marmaroneck, NY | Fixed-pitch propellers | 2005 | New Bedford–Martha's Vineyard/Nantucket | |
| Whaling City Express | New England Fast Ferry | 95 ft. | 149 | 29 knots (33 mph) | Derecktor Shipyards, Marmaroneck, NY | Fixed-pitch propellers | 2004 | New Bedford–Martha's Vineyard/Nantucket | |
| Commodore | Seastreak | 150 ft. | 600 (520 indoors, 240 outdoors) | 35 knots | Gulf Craft, Franklin, Louisiana | High-speed water jets | 2018 | New Jersey-New York | |
| Courageous | Seastreak | 157 ft. | 600 (520 indoors, 240 outdoors) | 35 knots | Midship Marine, Harvey, Louisiana | High-speed water jets | 2021 | New Jersey-New York NJ/NY-Martha's Vineyard/Nantucket | |
| Home Run | Seastreak | 67.1 ft. | 149 | 28 knots | Gladding-Hearn Shipbuilding, Somerset, MA | High-speed water jets | 2026 | NJ/NY-Yankee Stadium/Citi Field Stamford, CT-Citi Field | |

Seastreak operates a fleet of ten diesel-powered double-hulled catamarans. The MV Nantucket Express is propelled by a Servogear CPP Propeller System, while the MV Seastreak Highlands, MV Nantucket Express, MV Seastreak New Jersey, and MV Seastreak New York are propelled by high speed water jets. These vessels all 141 foot long, owned by Seastreak; each has a capacity of 505 passengers and travels at a top speed of 38 knots (44 mph). The vessels were designed in Australia by Incat Designs, and built in the United States by the Gladding-Hearn Shipbuilding in Somerset, Massachusetts.

The Ocean State is a 65-foot vessel owned by New England Fast Ferry; it has a capacity of 149 passengers and can travel up to 29 knots (33 mph). It is used as the ferry for the seasonal Providence to Newport route. The vessel was built by Merrifield-Roberts of Bristol. It is propelled by a pair of ZF propellers.

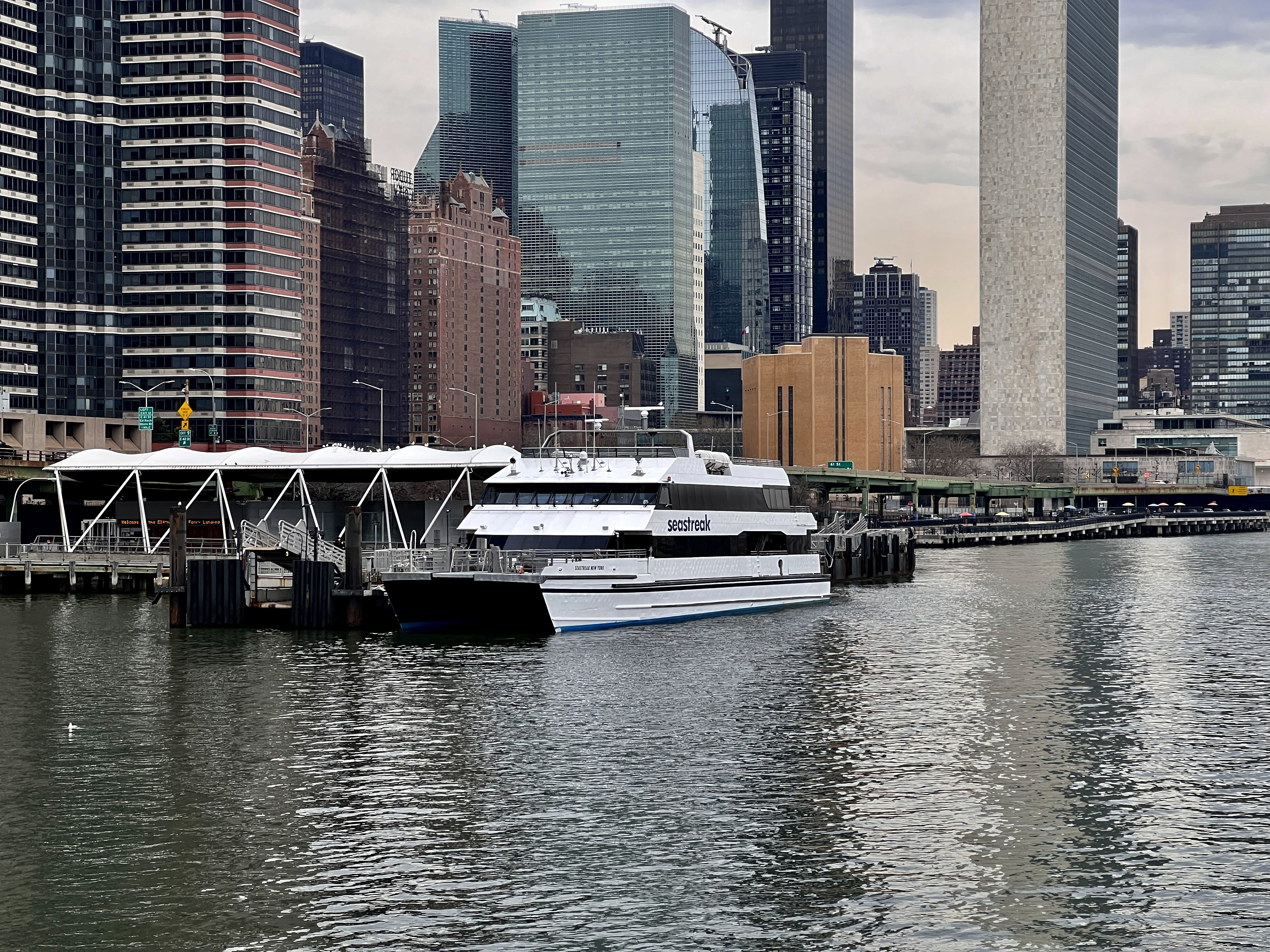
Seastreak New York docked at the East 34th Street Ferry Landing

The Martha's Vineyard Express and Whaling City Express are 95-foot vessels owned by New England Fast Ferry and have a capacity of 149 passengers and can travel up to 29 knots (33 mph). The vessels were built by Derecktor Shipyards of Mamaroneck. They operate between the Port of New Bedford and Martha's Vineyard during the summer months but began a reduced year-round service in 2023. They are propelled by fixed-pitched propellers.

Past vessels have included the Seastreak Manhattan, the Seastreak Brooklyn, and the Seastreak Liberty, among a few others. All of these catamaran ferries were designed by Incat Designs.

Seastreak announced construction of a 600-passenger high-speed luxury ferry in September 2016 for service between the Jersey Shore and Manhattan, anticipated to enter service in 2017. Construction took longer than planned, and the vessel, named the Commodore, was launched in March 2018, entering service the next month. The vessel has 520 seats indoors and 240 seats outdoors, with a top speed of 35 knots, and a length of 150 feet. It is propelled by high speed water jets.

The Courageous was delivered in December 2021 but initially remained out of service due to decreased ridership following the COVID-19 pandemic in the United States. It was built with the intention of accommodating more passengers on its East Side route as well as running the New Jersey/New York to Martha's Vineyard/Nantucket trips. The Courageous has a length of 157 feet. It is currently the largest high-speed passenger ferry in the United States. It is propelled by high speed water jets.

The tenth and newest ferry added to the Seastreak fleet, the Home Run, was purchased in late 2025 to provide more frequent service to Yankees and Mets games, serve as a backup boat to avoid service disruptions, and potentially offer additional off-peak service in the early mornings and late evenings. It was built in 2005 and designed by Incat Crowther. It is similar to Seastreak’s Ocean State and can carry 149 passengers.

== Routes ==
Seastreak routes connect the towns of Atlantic Highlands and Highlands in Monmouth County, New Jersey with Battery Maritime Building Slip 5, Battery Park City Ferry Terminal, and the East 34th Street Ferry Landing on the East River in Manhattan. During the morning rush hour, the trip from the Raritan Bayshore to Manhattan takes approximately 40 minutes. From Memorial Day weekend through Labor Day weekend, service is also provided to the public beaches in Sandy Hook a few times each day. Service is also provided to Yankee Stadium for New York Yankees games and to Citi Field for New York Mets games on weekends. Service to Yankee games depart solely from Highlands, NJ while ferries to Mets games at Citi Field depart from Highlands as well as the St. George Terminal on Staten Island, New York. The company has long offered "special event cruises" such as sightseeing excursions, sunset cruises, trips to Broadway matinees, college football games at West Point, the Macy's Fourth of July fireworks, the Macy's Thanksgiving Day Parade, and to see the fall foliage in the Hudson Valley.

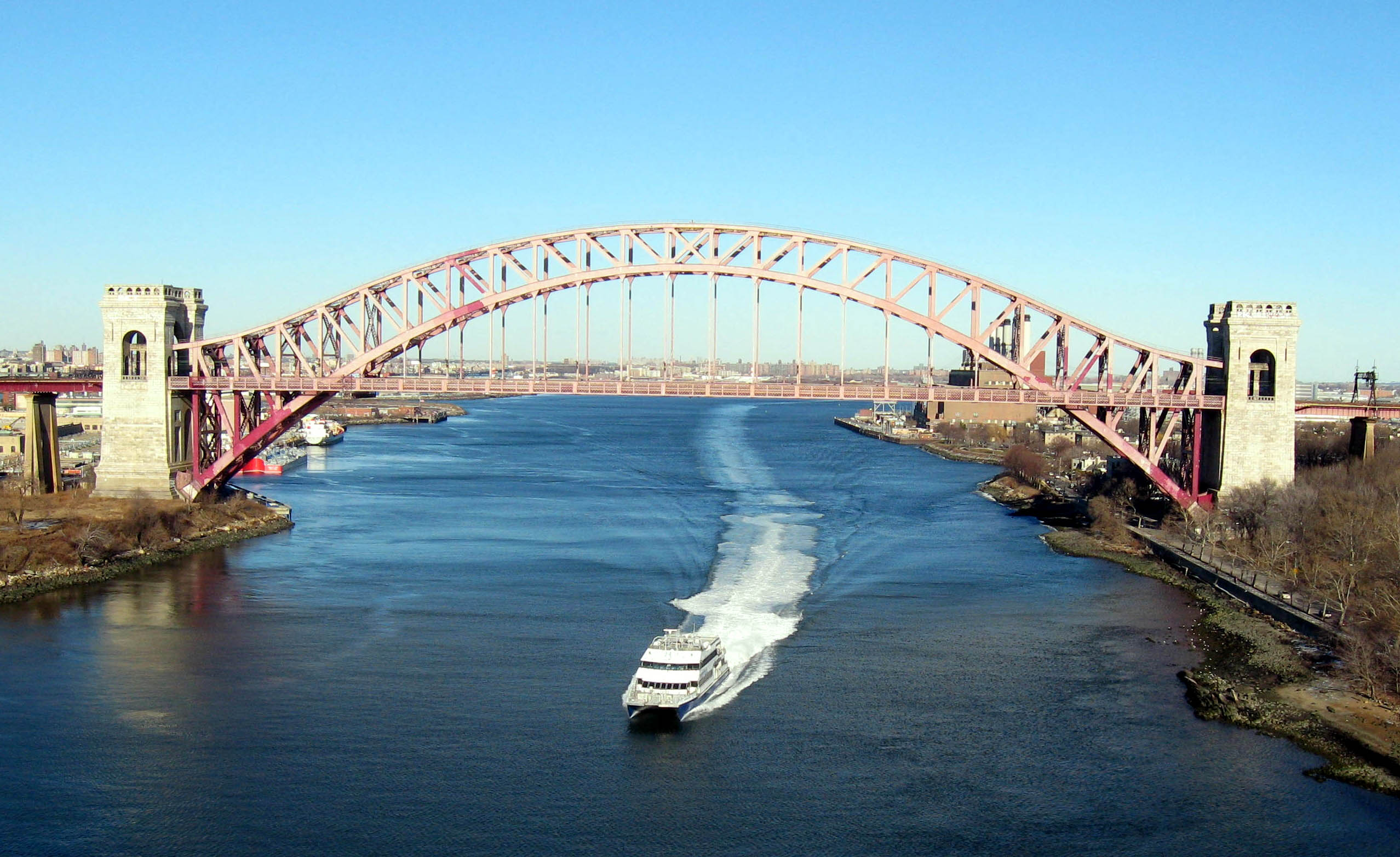
Passing under Hell Gate Bridge

On July 17, 2009, Seastreak began providing select summer weekend service from Highlands, NJ and New York City to Martha's Vineyard and Nantucket. One ferry departs on Friday afternoon from the Highlands Terminal and East 34th Street in Manhattan and returns on Sunday evening. The trip up the Long Island Sound and along the shoreline of Rhode Island and Massachusetts takes approximately five to six hours. The seasonal service was extended to Nantucket beginning in 2015. Before launching its service to Martha's Vineyard, Seastreak had expressed an interest in providing a similar service on summer weekends to Sag Harbor in the Hamptons, but there were concerns over traffic and ferry service is a non-permitted use in the village code.

=== Hurricane Sandy service ===
After Hurricane Sandy in October 2012 destroyed much of the IND Rockaway Line (A train), severing most subway service between the Rockaway peninsula of Queens, Seastreak began running a city-subsidized ferry service between a makeshift ferry slip at Beach 108th Street and Beach Channel Drive in Rockaway Park and Pier 11/Wall Street in Manhattan's Financial District, then continuing on to the East 34th Street Ferry Landing. In August 2013, a stop was added at Brooklyn Army Terminal in advance of the temporary closure of the Montague Street Tunnel (R train) between Brooklyn and Manhattan. In December 2013, it was reported that since inception, the run between Rockaway and Manhattan had attracted an average of about 730 passengers per day, on top of the approximately 250 daily passengers traveling between Brooklyn and Manhattan. The ferry by that time had carried nearly 200,000 passengers since its inception, according to city officials.

Originally intended as a stopgap alternative transportation measure only for the months until subway service was restored at the end of May in 2013, the ferry service proved to be popular with locals, and the city's contract with Seastreak was initially extended until July 2013 and then was subsequently extended again, first till mid-October 2013 and then until January 2014. Community organizations, activists and elected officials in Rockaway and Brooklyn campaigned for a permanent extension of the subsidized service. Though full service on the Montague Street Tunnel was restored in mid-September 2014, many commuters continued to take the ferry, despite its extra $1 cost over the subway fare. In mid-October, Mayor Bill de Blasio visited Rockaway and declared that the time had come to end the ferry service, since all of the subway service that it had replaced was now back in operation. Despite efforts from other local officials, the ferry last ran on October 31, 2014, after Seastreak was unsuccessful in procuring an extension of the service. Rockaway ferry service resumed on May 1, 2017, as part of the NYC Ferry service, which is operated by Hornblower Cruises.

== Crashes and incidents ==
In October 2003, eight passengers were evacuated to Staten Island after a fire broke out aboard a ferry heading to the Raritan Bayshore.

On January 9, 2013, at around 8:45 a.m., MV Seastreak Wall Street, arriving at Pier 11 from Atlantic Highlands, rammed into the mooring as it was docking, leaving a visible gash in the ferry stretching several feet above the water line. The president of the ferry company, James R. Barker, told NBC News that morning that there were 300 aboard and that many of those injured were thrown from their seats. The cause of the accident was not immediately clear. Eighty-five people were injured, two critically. According to the captain, the control system of the boat failed to respond. Lawsuits seeking damages have been brought by injured passengers. As of May 16, 2013, the deadline for filing, thirty-seven claims had been made against the company. The case will be heard in admiralty court since the accident took place on navigable waters.

On June 5, 2021, at around 4:15 p.m., the Commodore ran aground in the Bushwick Inlet in Brooklyn. One crew member was injured, and approximately 100 passengers were evacuated.

== In popular culture ==
The ferry is seen during a romantic moment passing underneath the Brooklyn Bridge in the movie Step Up 3D. It is seen still operating in the year 2021 in the movie Click. A ferry is also seen moving down the East River in the final shot of the 2002 film Gangs of New York, in which the Brooklyn Bridge and the World Trade Center can be seen.
