= MV Grey Lady IV =

MV Grey Lady IV is a high-speed catamaran ferry operated by Hy-Line Cruises that runs on a route between Hyannis and Nantucket, Massachusetts.

Hy-Line's request to regulator Woods Hole, Martha's Vineyard and Nantucket Steamship Authority to construct the ship that would become Grey Lady IV was approved in May 2014, and the vessel was ordered from Gladding-Hearn Shipbuilding in February 2015. Construction began on May 13, 2015, with delivery planned for early June 2016. However, delays during construction meant that she was not launched until July 6, and Hy-Line finally took delivery on August 31. Grey Lady IV entered service on September 2.

Grey Lady IV was designed by Incat Crowther, and is 153.5 feet (46.8 m) long, with a beam of 34.5 feet (10.5 m) and a draft of 8 feet (2.4 m). She has a passenger capacity of 493 on three decks. She is powered by four Cummins diesel engines working through Twin Disc gears which drive quad HamiltonJet HM721 waterjets, which give her a top speed of 34 knots (39 mph) when loaded.
