= Hy-Line Cruises =

American ferry and cruise company

Coordinates: 41°38′53.2″N 70°16′45.2″W

Hyannis Harbor Tours, Inc.
- Trade name: Hy-Line Cruises
- Company type: Private
- Industry: Ferries; Sightseeing tours
- Founded: 1962; 64 years ago
- Founders: Richard Scudder; Robert Scudder; E. Raymond Taylor
- Headquarters: Hyannis, Massachusetts
- Key people: Frederic Scudder, II (President); Philip Scudder (Vice President); Richard Scudder, Jr. (Vice President)
- Number of employees: 100 (year-round), 350 (summer)
- Website: hylinecruises.com

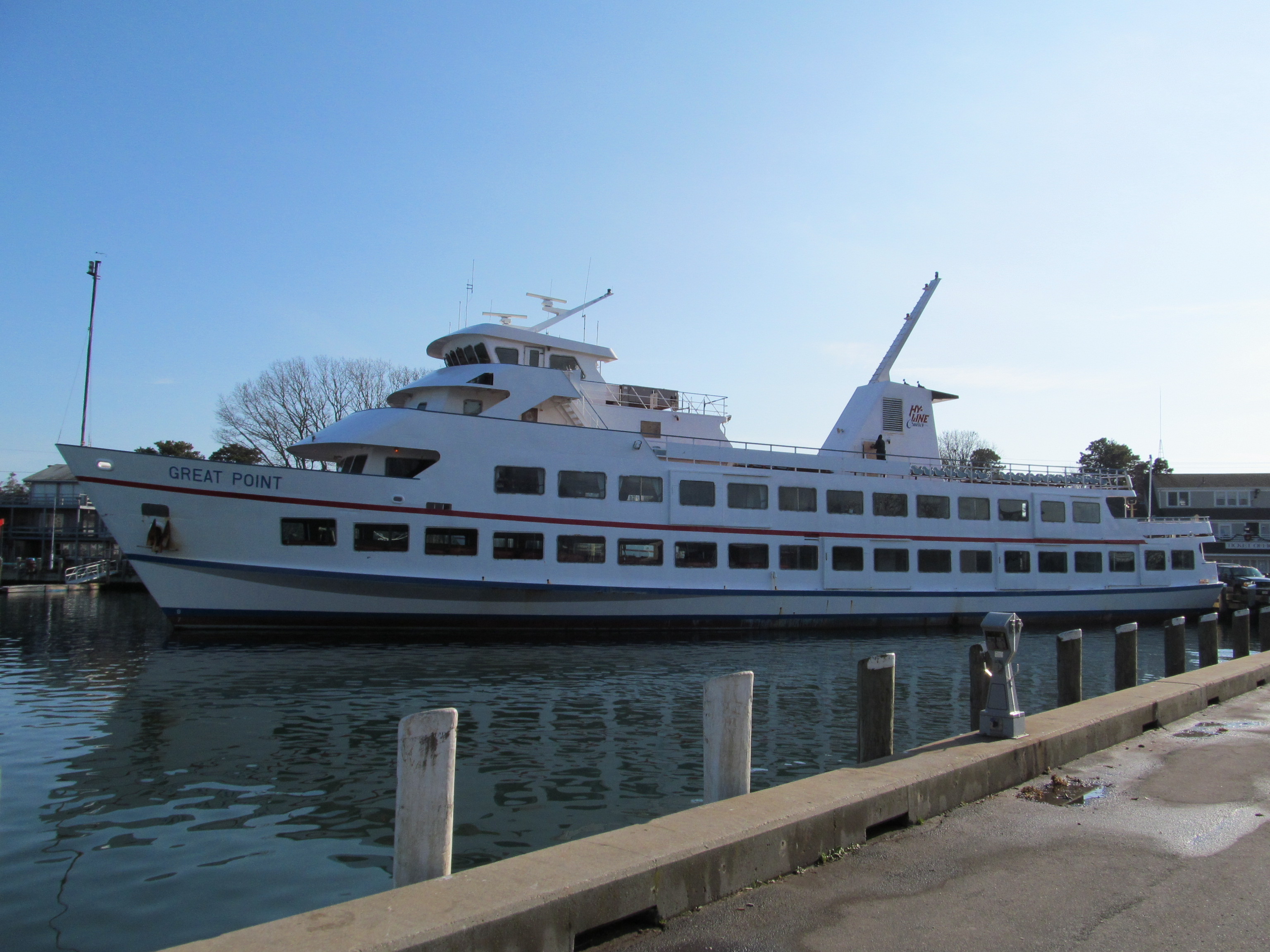
M/V Great Point in Hyannis

Hy-Line Cruises (colloquially referred to as Hy-Line, and legally Hyannis Harbor Tours Inc.) is an American family owned and operated Massachusetts ferry and cruise company. The company currently operates the second largest passenger ferry service between mainland Cape Cod and the islands of Martha's Vineyard and Nantucket (after the Steamship Authority). The company also operates sightseeing cruises and fishing charters. The company's main office is located at 22 Channel Point Road in Hyannis.

== History ==
Hy-Line Cruises began operations in 1962 as Hyannis Harbor Tours run by Richard Scudder and his brother Robert. Originally, the company focused on sightseeing harbor tours, which it still does today. The company added deep-sea fishing charters in 1966 and started running seasonal passenger-ferry services in 1970, first to Martha's Vineyard and then to Nantucket in 1972 when Hyannis Harbor Tours bought out The Nantucket Boat Company, which at that time was doing business as Hi-line. Hyannis Harbor Tours took this trade name and changed it to Hy-Line.

In 1995, Hy-Line Cruises started the first high-speed catamaran service to Nantucket; its original vessel was shortly replaced by a larger one in 1997, which in turn was replaced in 2003 by the Grey Lady. Hy-Line introduced high-speed service to Martha's Vineyard in 2005, using its 1997-built ferry Lady Martha. Another high-speed catamaran, Grey Lady IV, was delivered in 2016 to replace Hy-Line's monohull vessel, the Great Point on the Nantucket route.

== Current operations ==
=== Island ferry service ===
Hy-Line Cruises operates high-speed catamaran ferry service between Hyannis and Nantucket (year-round) and Hyannis and Oak Bluffs, Martha's Vineyard (seasonally). The journey time is approximately one hour. The company also operates seasonal inter-island trips between Martha's Vineyard and Nantucket.

All of Hy-Line Cruises ferry services are passenger only (although bicycles are carried for a small fee) due to the legal monopoly held on vehicle ferry service that is held by the Steamship Authority. Any new Hy-Line services must be approved by the authority, which serves as a regulatory body for service to and from the Islands.

=== Sightseeing cruises ===
Hy-Line Cruises also operates seasonal sightseeing cruises in and around Hyannis Harbor, and the Cape Cod Canal, (the latter sailing from the Wareham village of Onset).

=== Fishing ===
Out of Hyannis, Hy-Line operates seasonal half-day deep sea fishing trips in Nantucket Sound. The fishing boats, Sea Queen II and Sea Swan, go out daily in the Spring and Summer to fish in Nantucket Sound. They offer bottom fishing trips for scup and black sea bass, along with Captain's Choice trips for whatever the captain thinks will be the best fishing.

== Fleet ==
Vessel	Service began	Route	Notes
MV Sea Queen II	1966		Aluminum monohull, rebuilt in 1977 by Breaux Baycraft and reintroduced to the fleet in 2000, used for deep-sea fishing trips
MV Viking	1973	Hyannis Harbor Cruise	Steel monohull, built in 1954 by Blount Marine
MV Grey Lady	2003	Hyannis–Nantucket	High speed catamaran, built by Gladding-Heam Shipbuilding
MV Lady Martha	2005	Hyannis–Martha's Vineyard	High speed catamaran, originally named Grey Lady II and served Hyannis–Nantucket route from 1997 to 2003
MV Vineyard Lady	2015	Hyannis–Martha's Vineyard	High speed catamaran, built in 2007 by Yank Marine
MV Grey Lady IV	2016	Hyannis–Nantucket	High speed catamaran, built by Gladding-Heam Shipbuilding
MV Monhegan	2023	Cape Cod Canal Cruises	Built in 1959 for the Maine State Ferry Co. as a car ferry.

=== Former fleet ===
Hy-Line also acquired two vessels upon purchasing the Nantucket Boat Company in 1972.

Vessel	Service began	Service ended	Notes
Prudence	1962		
MV Sea Swan II	1966		Used for deep-sea fishing trips
MV East Chop	1971	after 2012	Built in 1971
MV Brant Point	1972		sold to Boston Harbor Cruises
MV Cross Rip	1976		Twin screw vessel, operated inter-island service Nantucket and Martha's Vineyard
MV Great Point	1988	2016	"First-class" vessel serving Nantucket, replaced by Grey Lady IV
MV Grey Lady	1996		First high-speed catamaran service to serve Nantucket

== See also ==
- The Steamship Authority
