= MBTA ferry =

Ferry service in Massachusetts, US

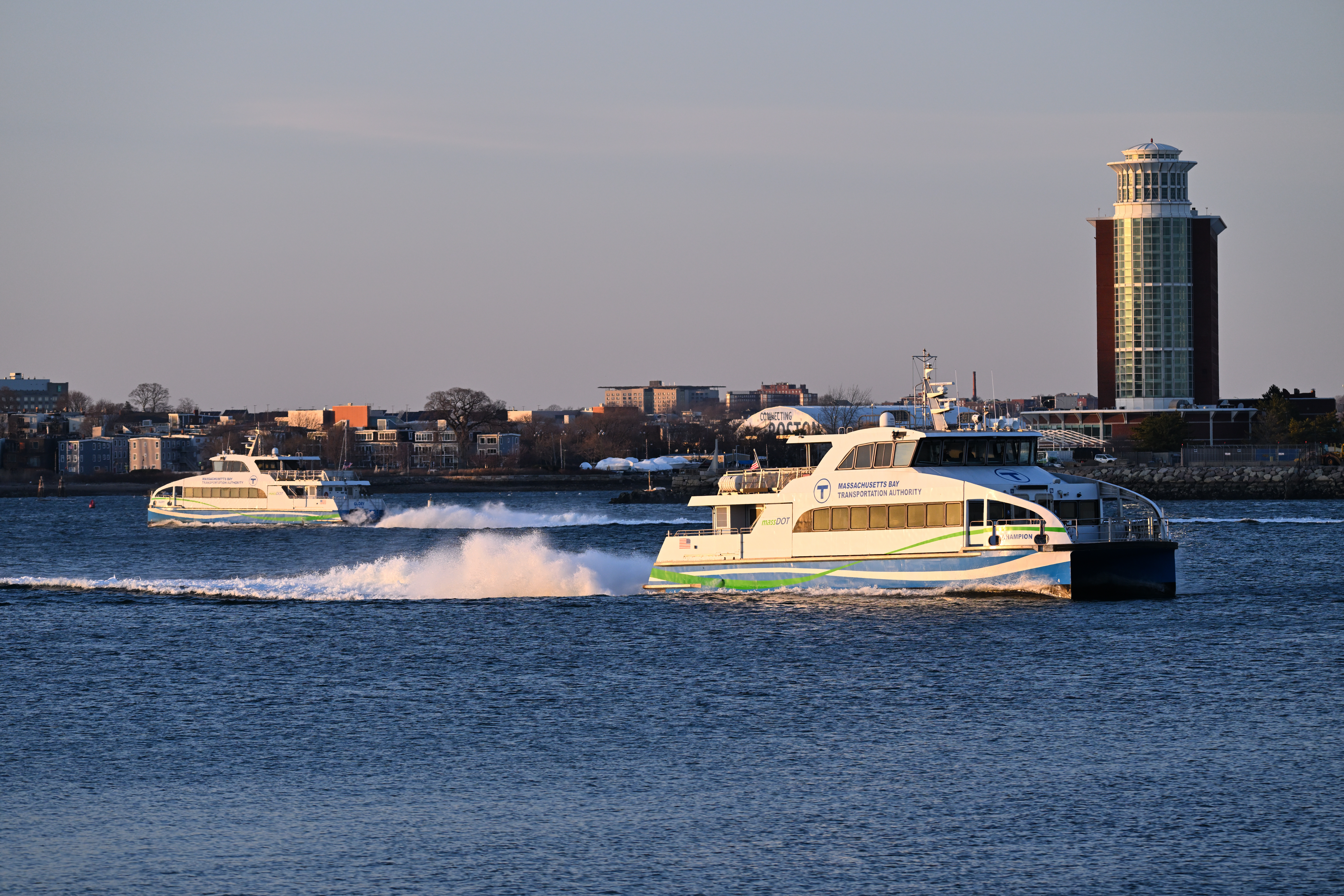
- MBTA ferries Champion and Glory in March 2025
- Waterway: Boston Harbor
- Operator: Hornblower Cruises (under contract to the Massachusetts Bay Transportation Authority)
- No. of lines: 9
- No. of terminals: 15
- Daily ridership: 2,700 (weekdays, Q1 2026)
- Yearly ridership: 1,498,200 (2025)
Route map
- All ferry terminals are accessible

The MBTA ferry system is a public boat service providing water transportation in Boston Harbor. It is operated by Hornblower Cruises (branded as City Cruises) under contract to the Massachusetts Bay Transportation Authority (MBTA). In 2025, the system had a ridership of 1,498,200, or about 2,700 per weekday as of the first quarter of 2026. The system has nine routes that terminate in downtown Boston. Year-round routes run to Hingham directly (F1) and via Hull (F2H), to the Charlestown Navy Yard (F4), and as an inner harbor circulator (F10). Seasonal routes run to East Boston (F3), Lynn (F5), Winthrop (F6), and Quincy (F7); combined Winthrop/Quincy weekend service operates as F8.

In the 19th century, numerous steamship routes ran from Boston to various destinations in the inner harbor, North Shore, and South Shore, plus routes to elsewhere in New England and to Europe. Ferry service declined in the late 19th century and 20th century due to competition from railways, streetcars, and finally automobiles; by the 1930s, only summer routes plus the East Boston ferry remained. Year round service to Hull was reintroduced in 1963, and was then the only commuter ferry service in the country. This was followed by Hingham service in 1975, tourist-oriented Charlestown service in 1979, and Quincy service in 1996 – as well as several other short-lived routes.

Most routes were either unsubsidized or state-funded; from 1986 to 2002, they gradually became subsidized by the MBTA. Service to Quincy and Hull was combined in 1998; in 2013, the Quincy terminal was replaced by Hingham. Winthrop service began in 2016, with a stop at Marina Bay in Quincy added later that year; it was taken over by the MBTA in 2023. East Boston service began in 2022. Lynn service began in 2023 after several previous iterations failed. Weekday Winthrop and Quincy service was split into separate routes in 2025. The inner harbor circulator was added in 2026.

The MBTA owns some ferries, while Hornblower owns others. The ferry system has the highest on-time performance and farebox recovery ratio of MBTA service types. However, it is only a small component of MBTA service: in 2016, the three routes then funded by the MBTA carried 5,070 passengers per weekday – about 0.4% of total MBTA ridership.

== Routes ==
The MBTA has eight ferry routes: three year-round, and five that operate seasonally. One route has year-round weekend service, while four routes also have seasonal weekend service. (F8 serves as a weekend-only combination of the F6 and F7 routes.)

Route	Boston terminal	Outer terminal	Service span	Weekday round trips	Weekend round trips	Fare	Fare zone
F1	Rowes Wharf	Hingham	Year-round	18	–	$9.75	6
F2H	Long Wharf	Hingham via Logan Airport and Hull (Note: Some trips only serve one of Hingham and Hull. Logan Airport is only served on some trips. A small number of trips also serve Georges Island; separate fares apply for Georges Island.)	Year-round (weekend service seasonal)	19	14–16	$9.75	6
F3	Long Wharf	East Boston	Seasonal	22	18	$2.40	1A
F4	Long Wharf	Charlestown Navy Yard	Year-round	39	17	$3.70	1A
F5	Long Wharf	Lynn Ferry Terminal	Seasonal	5	5 1/2	$7.00	2
F6	Central Wharf	Winthrop via Fan Pier and Logan Airport (Note: Logan Airport is only served on some trips.)	Seasonal	10	–	$6.50	1
F7	Central Wharf	Marina Bay, Quincy via Fan Pier and Logan Airport	Seasonal	10	–	$6.50	1
F8	Central Wharf	Marina Bay, Quincy via Fan Pier, Logan Airport, and Winthrop	Seasonal	–	6 1/2	$6.50	1
F10	Lovejoy Wharf	Loop via Logan Airport, Commonwealth Pier, and Central Wharf (Note: The loop operates counterclockwise in the morning and clockwise in the afternoon.)	Year-round	18	–	$2.40	1A

== History ==
=== Charlestown ===
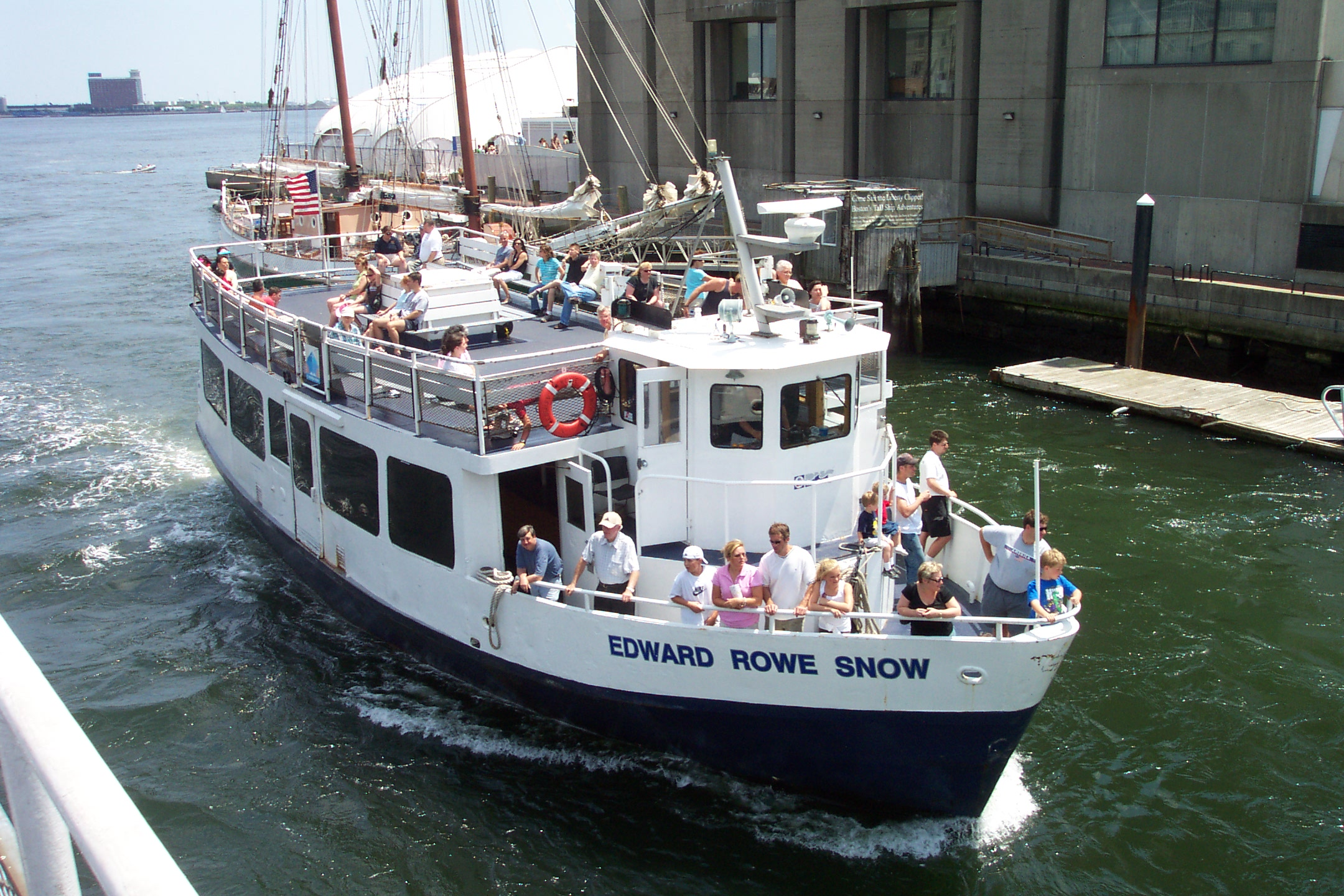
The ferry Edward Rowe Snow (now Rookie) on the F4 route in 2006

Boat service between Boston and Charlestown ended in 1786 after the completion of the Charles River Bridge. The Winnisimmet Ferry between the North End and Chelsea ran until January 1917. A privately-run service with the same name operated between Rowes Wharf and Chelsea from May 15 to September 28, 1990, during early Big Dig construction. Boston Harbor Cruises (BHC) began tourist-oriented service, funded by the National Park Service, between Long Wharf and the Navy Yard in June 1979. In June 1987, this was switched to general-purpose ferry service funded by the Boston Redevelopment Authority. In October 1988, the Massachusetts Department of Public Works (DPW) began a four-year reconfiguration of the interchange between the Tobin Bridge and the Charlestown High Bridge. Charlestown ferry service was then increased, with funding from the DPW via the MBTA, and increased again in 1989. In 2004, the MBTA began directly funding the service.

In 2019, discussion began about replacing the aging over 30 year old Charlestown ferries with new state of the art hybrid propulsion ferries, however this never materialized. Hornblower Cruises acquired BHC in late 2019 and rebranded it as City Cruises in 2021, with no change to MBTA ferry operations. F4 service was indefinitely suspended on March 17, 2020 due to reduced ridership during the COVID-19 pandemic. On June 22, 75% of weekday service was restored, though weekend service remained suspended. F4 service was again temporarily suspended from January 23 to May 21, 2021; weekday and weekend service resumed on May 22.

=== East Boston ===
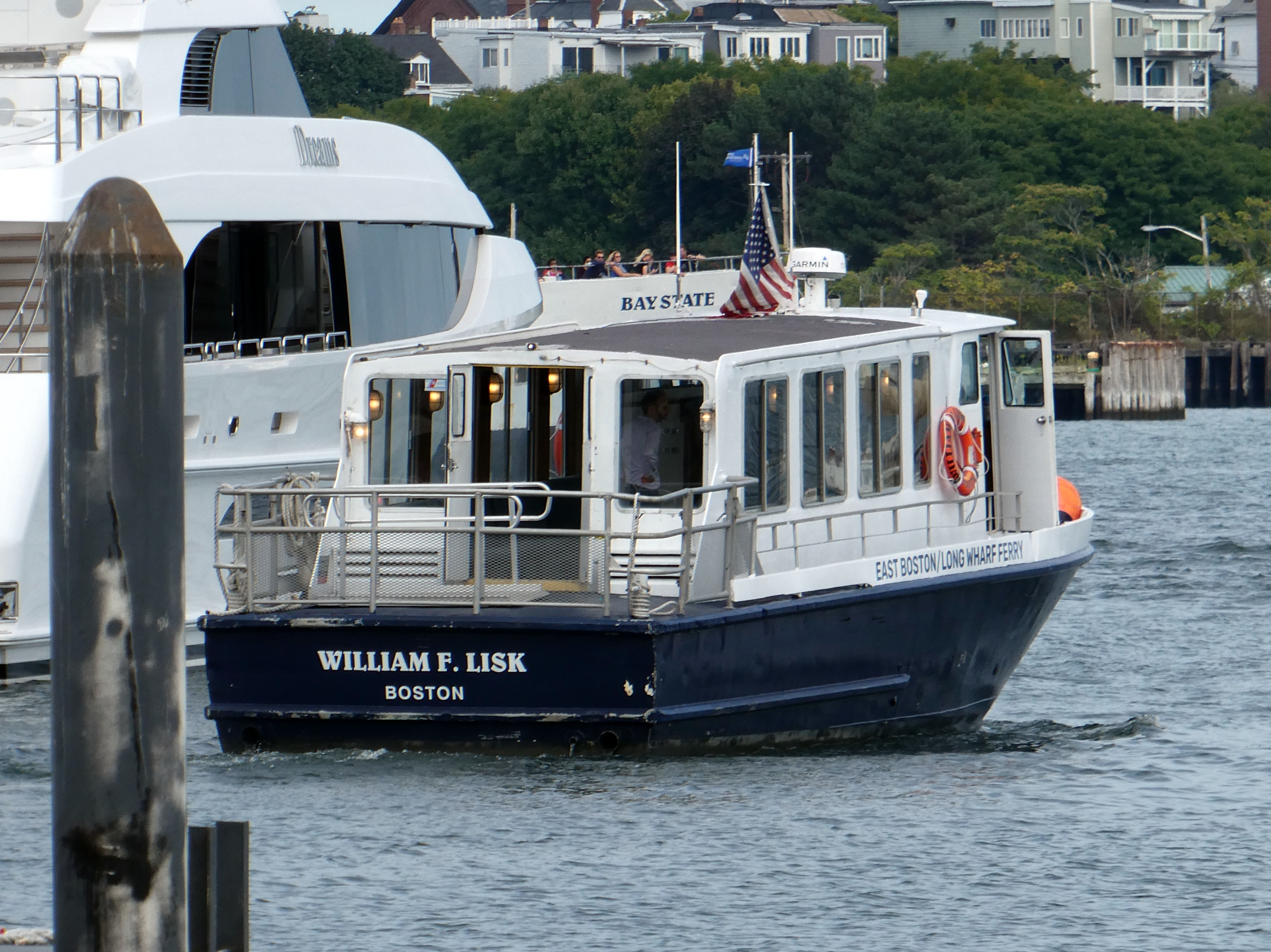
Long Wharf–East Boston ferry in 2022

Ferry service to East Boston began in 1832. The North Ferry (Battery Street to Border Street) ended in 1938 after the 1934 opening of the Sumner Tunnel; the BRB&L ferry (Rowes Wharf to Jeffries Point) ended in 1940, while the South Ferry (Sargent's Wharf to Lewis Wharf) lasted until 1952. City-run service ran from a new wharf at Lewis Street to Long Wharf from 1995 to 1997; it was discontinued due to extremely low ridership (an average of 1.3 passengers per trip) as the Blue Line provided a faster and more frequent service along the same corridor.

In 2011, then-mayor Thomas Menino proposed ferry service between East Boston and Fan Pier on the South Boston Waterfront, a route without current direct transit service. In August 2012, the Federal Highway Administration awarded $1.28 million to the city for the purchase of two boats. In September 2012, the Boston Redevelopment Authority accepted the grant and agreed to rehabilitate the East Boston Marine Terminal for the ferries, which were then expected to begin operation in 2013. In August 2014, the MBTA opened bidding for providing the two boats for East Boston service. However, the grant was less than the actual cost of two boats, and plans for the service stalled.

A privately funded Lewis Wharf–Fan Pier route began operation in September 2021. Temporary Long Wharf–Lewis Wharf ferry service was run from April 25 to May 17, 2022, during a closure of the Blue Line tunnel for maintenance. A pilot program of seasonal Long Wharf–Lewis Wharf service began on September 12, 2022, with 22 round trips on weekdays and 19 on weekends. Seasonal service continued in 2023 and 2024 and was made permanent in 2025.

=== Lovejoy Wharf routes ===
Two MBTA-funded routes – the F3 Lovejoy Wharf–Boston Navy Yard and F5 Lovejoy Wharf–World Trade Center via Moakley Courthouse – began operation in 1997 during Big Dig construction. They were discontinued on January 21, 2005 due to low ridership. The F5X Lovejoy Wharf–World Trade Center express route was not funded by the MBTA and was run until February 24, 2006. A pilot (originally scheduled for one year) of a privately funded Lovejoy Wharf–Fan Pier route, intended mostly as a private employee shuttle, began in January 2019. It is overseen by the Massachusetts Convention Center Authority on behalf of private companies in the Seaport, rather than by the MBTA. The fare for public riders was substantially reduced in April 2019. An extension of the route to Raymond L. Flynn Marine Park began in August 2025.

A new year-round route, the F10 Harbor Loop, was added on June 29, 2026. It operates in a loop between Central Wharf, Lovejoy Wharf, Logan Airport, and Commonwealth Pier. It runs only during weekday peak periods, with counterclockwise service in the morning and clockwise service in the evening.

=== South Shore ===
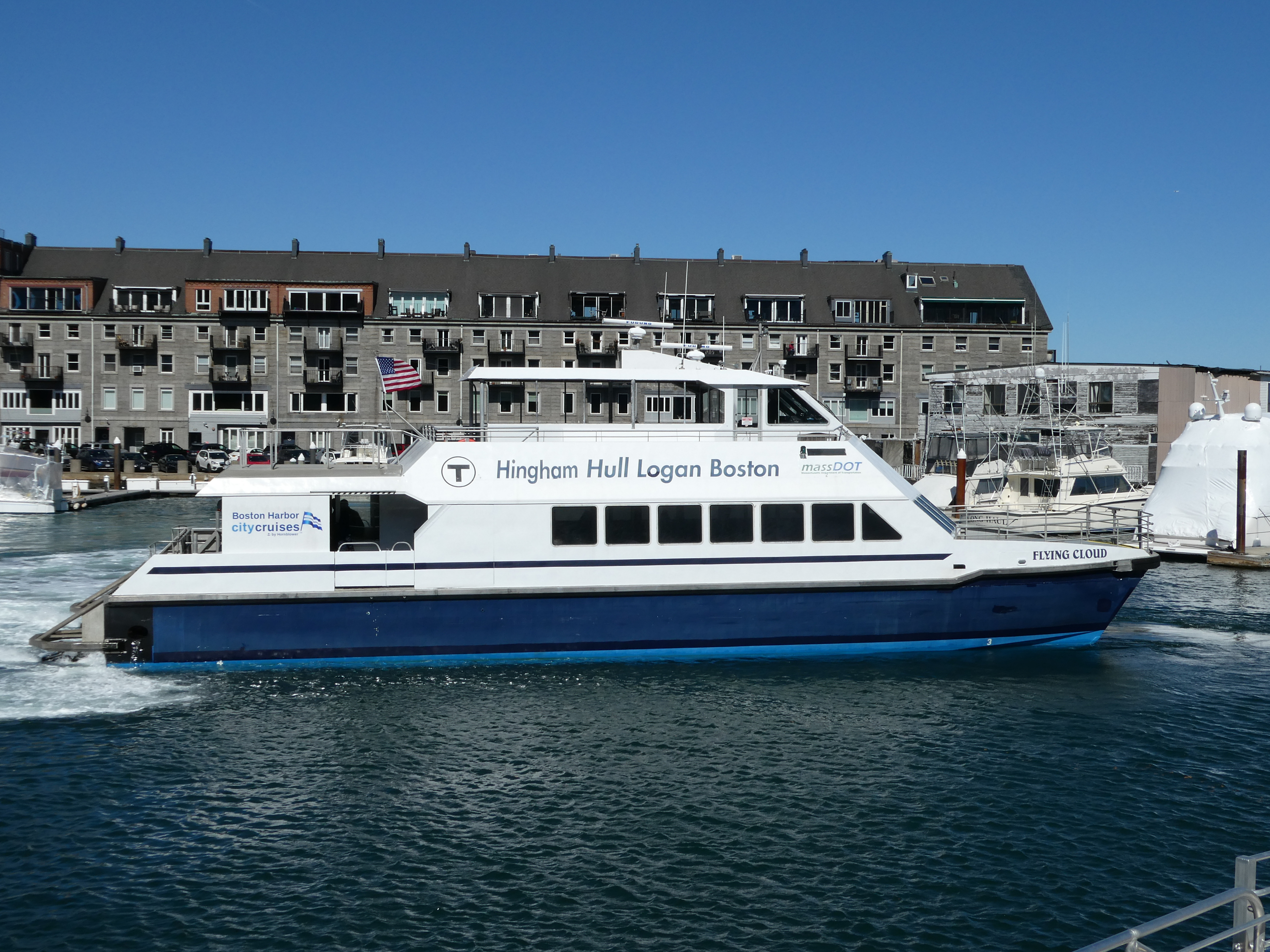
The MBTA-owned Flying Cloud at Long Wharf on F2H service in 2022

Ferry service between Boston and Hingham began in 1832; after the South Shore Railroad began operation in 1849, ferries served largely recreational traffic rather than commuters. Service to Hull was added in 1848 (first Allerton Harbor, later Pemberton Point), and to Nantasket Beach in 1869. Service to the Hingham shipyard ended in 1898, though some service to Crow's Point lasted until 1923. Most of the Nantasket Boat Lines ferries were destroyed in a 1929 fire. The service was increasingly unprofitable to run; only summer service lasted past 1933. Hingham service ended in 1952; the last remains of Nantasket service ended in 1963. Massachusetts Bay Lines (MBL) restored year-round Pemberton Point–Boston service in March 1963 – then the only commuter ferry service in the country – followed by seasonal Nantasket service in 1964. Bay State Cruises took over the route in 1980. Paragon Park closed in 1985, and Nantasket service ended again in 1992. In 1996, Bay State Cruises sold the Hull route to Boston Harbor Cruises (BHC), who obtained an MBTA subsidy.

Renewed Rowes Wharf–Hingham service began with a single round trip on October 6, 1975. The service was initiated by Ed King, then director of the Massachusetts Port Authority. Service was run by several operators, sometimes with state funding, most of the next eight years. In March 1983, Massachusetts Bay Commuter Services began eleven subsidized round trips (reduced to eight that June). The state began subsidizing eight additional round trips by Boston Harbor Commuter Services in 1984 during Southeast Expressway reconstruction. The MBTA began subsidizing service in 1986; after 1991, only Boston Harbor Commuter Services received a subsidy. In the 1990s, expanded ferry service was proposed as an alternative to the controversial return of commuter rail service on the Greenbush Line. Boston Harbor Cruises (which had briefly operated Hingham service in 1978) took over the Hingham–Boston service in 1997.

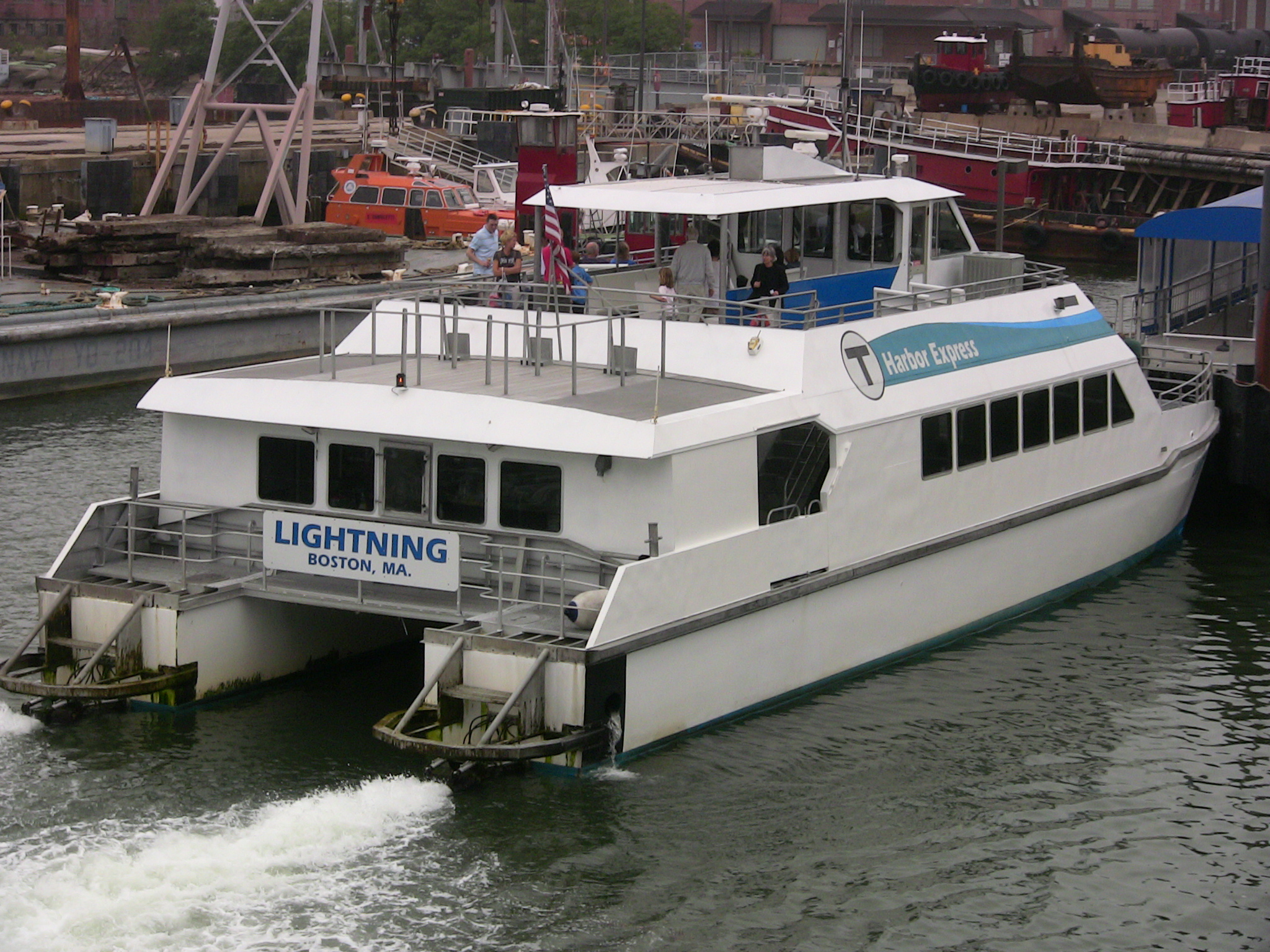
The MBTA-owned Lightning at Quincy on F2/F2H service in 2008

In 1996, Water Transportation Associates (WTA), doing business as Harbor Express, began service between Fore River Shipyard in Quincy and Long Wharf via Logan Airport. Two ferries and five years of operations were funded by then-shipyard owner General Dynamics. Quincy–Logan service began on November 18, 1996, with Long Wharf service added several weeks later. In 1998, the MBTA and BHC failed to reach a subsidy agreement. MBTA-subsidized Hull stops were added to several existing WTA Boston-Hingham trips. After the original funding ran out in 2001, the state funded service for the first half of 2002. In April 2002, the MBTA bought the WTA assets (two ferries, the Quincy terminal, and the Long Wharf lease); the WTA later won the contract to run the service. The MBTA designated the Hingham–Boston service as F1 and Quincy–Boston as F2, with trips serving Hull called F2H. Attempts in 2010 and 2011 to restore summer weekend service to Nantasket failed due to high fuel costs. On July 1, 2013, BHC took over Hingham services from WTA.

Quincy service was temporarily discontinued on October 14, 2013, with boats redirected to Hingham, when a water main break added to existing structural problems with the sea wall at the Quincy wharf. In January 2014, the MBTA made the closure (and increased Hingham service) permanent after it was determined that repairs would cost $15 million for five years of additional service, or $50 million for 50 years. The damage also forced the closure of the USS Salem museum. Quincy proposed Squantum Point as an alternative terminal to maintain ferry service to the city. In July 2014, a neighboring shipyard purchased the Quincy site from the MBTA.

Weekend summer service on the F2H route, last operated in 1998 and 1999, was introduced on May 24, 2014. The Hingham Intermodal Center was opened in January 2017, providing a larger waiting area and ticketing facilities. On January 2, 2018, ferry service to Hingham was indefinitely suspended due to ice damage to the dock during severe cold the previous week. Service resumed on January 15 after repairs to the dock. Squantum service was added to the Winthrop route in August 2016.

Hornblower Cruises acquired BHC in late 2019 and rebranded it as City Cruises in 2021, with no change to MBTA ferry operations. F1 and F2H service was suspended on March 17, 2020 due to reduced ridership during the COVID-19 pandemic. On June 22, 75% of weekday service was restored, though weekend service remained suspended. F1 service was again temporarily suspended on January 23, 2021, with limited F2H service continuing to operate. F1 service, stops at Logan Airport, and weekend service resumed on May 22.

=== North Shore ===
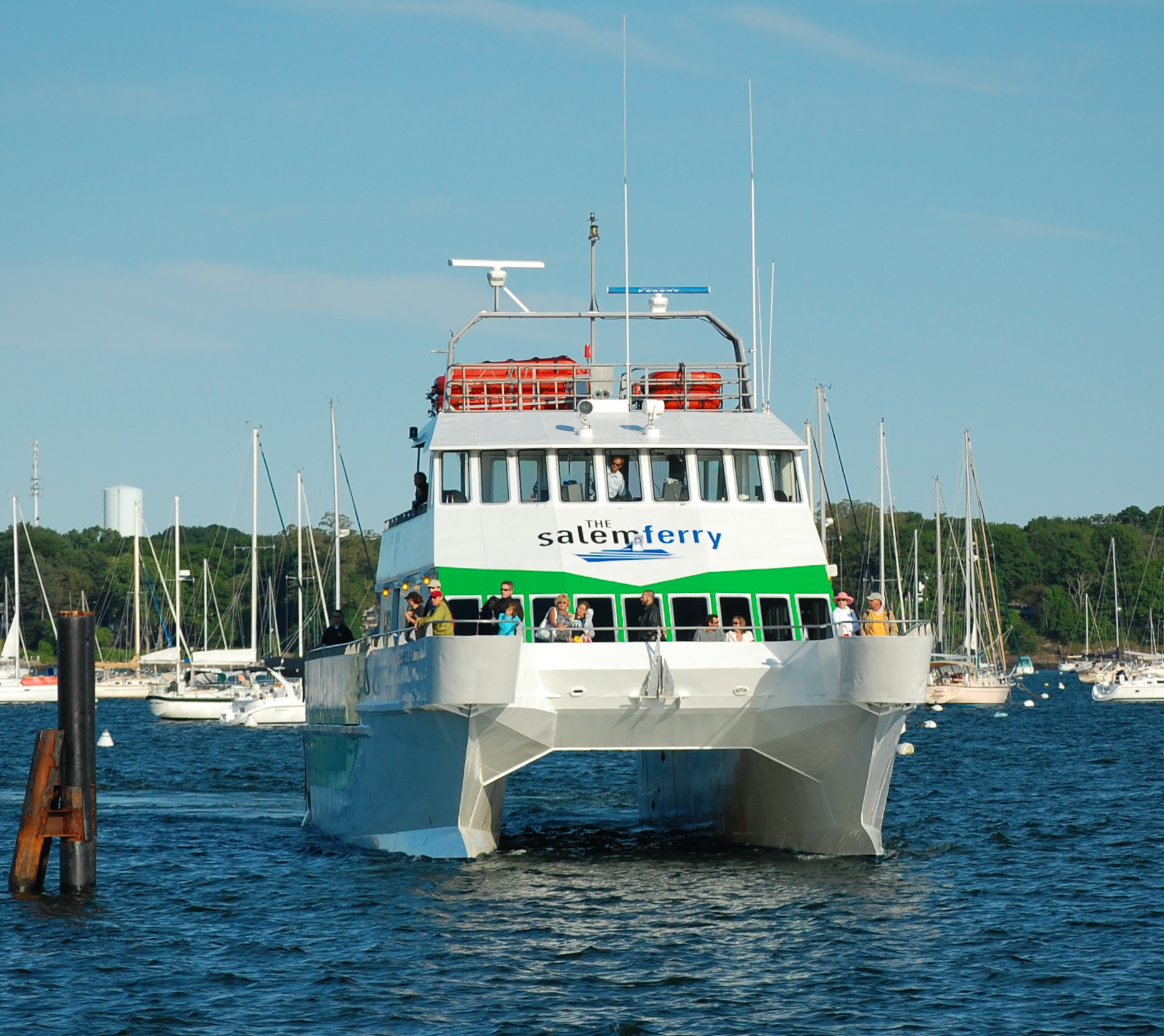
The Salem Fast Ferry in June 2009

Steamboat service between Salem and Boston was run at various points between 1818 and 1931; because of competition from the Eastern Railroad, it was largely intended for recreation. Service to Winthrop was operated during several periods between 1840 and 1898; it too was largely out-competed by the Boston, Revere Beach and Lynn Railroad for the commuter market. Lynn service was operated in the 1870s, and between 1892 and 1908. Ferry service between Boston and Salem was operated during the summer of 1998 by WTA, funded by a state grant. BHC ran unsubsidized service in the summers of 1999 and 2000. In 2025, the MBTA indicated the possibility of future Salem and Gloucester service.

==== Salem ====
Salem service resumed on June 22, 2006, with a ferry funded largely by a $2.3 million state grant. It was operated by WTA during the summers of 2006 to 2011; BHC took over the service without subsidy in 2012. In 2009, Salem began allowing MBTA Commuter Rail passes to be used on certain peak-hour trips. The MBTA stopped subsidizing the service around 2020, and MBTA passes stopped being accepted in 2023. In 2025, MBTA zone 3 passes were accepted again for the Salem Ferry for the 7:00am inbound, and 5:30pm return weekday departures.

==== Winthrop and Marina Bay ====
Winthrop service, run by BHC under a three-year state grant, began on August 2, 2010 and lasted until 2012. A local charter operator ran some unsubsidized service in 2013. Service resumed on April 16, 2016 with a town-owned vessel operated by town employees. The Marina Bay stop (previously served by several short-lived services between 1977 and 1997) was added on August 16, 2016. The Boston terminal was at Fan Pier from April to June 2017, then Rowes Wharf (with an intermediate Fan Pier stop) for the remainder of the summer. Central Wharf became the Boston terminal in 2018.

The service's high cost and low reliability has attracted criticism; it was not run for six weeks in 2019 due to mechanical issues and lack of staff. The MBTA took over operations of the Winthrop Ferry in July 2023. The lease agreement was for two years with up to three years of extensions. The route was split into separate direct Quincy and Winthrop services on weekdays with higher frequency when it resumed on April 28, 2025. Ridership on those routes tripled in summer 2025.

==== Lynn ====
The Lynn Ferry formerly operated from Lynn Ferry Terminal to Central Wharf. Service began on May 19, 2014 with three weekday round trips, as a two-year pilot program funded by the state. Fares were $3.50; MBTA Commuter Rail passes from Zone 2 or above were accepted for fares. Although the state spent $8.5 million on the terminal and $4.5 million in federal funds was secured for a larger ferry, the service was not run in summer 2016 due to lack of $700,000 in operations funding. Service resumed for June–September 2017 with funding from MassDOT, with one daily round trip timed for commuting. Fares were doubled to $7, and MBTA passes were not accepted. Due to low ridership in 2017 – just 30 daily passengers – the service was not resumed in 2018.

In May 2023, the MBTA indicated plans to resume Lynn service midyear. Service resumed on June 26, 2023 as an MBTA service, intended as mitigation for a temporary closure of the Sumner Tunnel. Ten round trips were operated on weekdays, with fares temporarily equal to subway fares during the tunnel closure. Service resumed on April 29, 2024, with weekend service added. The service was made permanent in 2025. In April 2025, Lynn ferry service was temporarily cut to two inbound and one outbound trip per day, with travel time increased from 40 minutes to 90 minutes. This was the result of a 10-knot (19 km/h; 12 mph) restriction in Broad Sound due to sightings of endangered right whales.

== Operations ==
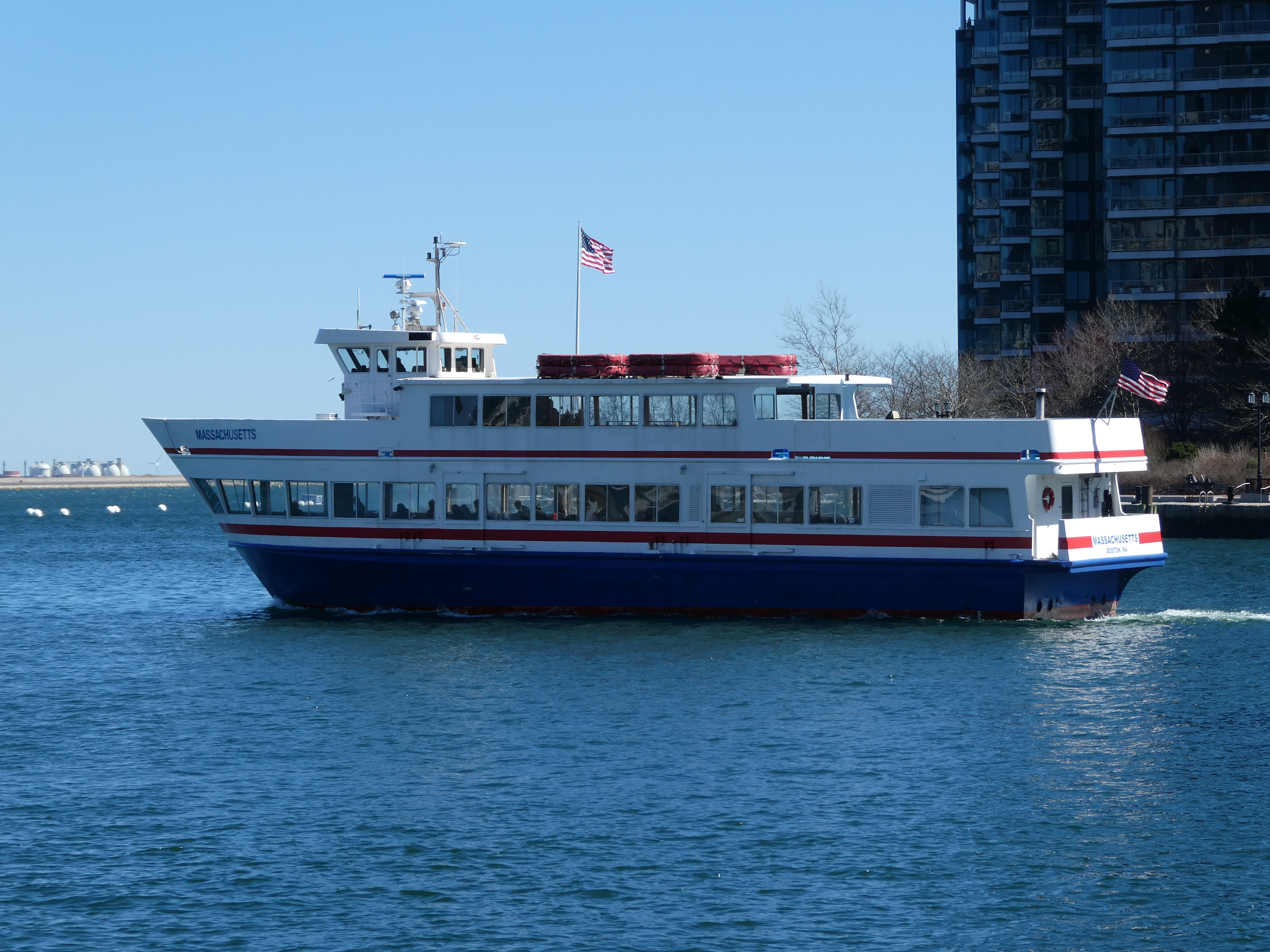
Massachusetts Bay Lines ferry Massachusetts operating route F1 in 2022

All MBTA-funded services are operated by the Boston Harbor Cruises subsidiary of Hornblower Cruises (branded as City Cruises) under contract to the MBTA. It is the most reliable mode of MBTA service, with on-time performance typically above 95%. In 2016, the MBTA-funded portion of the system carried 5,070 passengers per weekday – about 0.4% of total MBTA ridership.

=== Ferries ===
Until 2017, the MBTA owned two ferries, the Lightning and the Flying Cloud, both built in 1996. They were largely replaced by the new catamarans Champion (named for Champion of the Seas) in October 2017, and Glory (after Glory of the Seas) in May 2018. The MBTA-owned ferries are used for the F2H route, while Hornblower-owned ferries are used for the F1 and F4 routes. Some F1 trips are run by Massachusetts Bay Lines, using their own boats, under subcontract to Hornblower. As of December 2019, the MBTA planned to overhaul the older catamarans in 2020–22; new double-ended ferries for route F4 were also being considered. The MBTA acquired the used catamaran Ava Pearl (previously used for service between Rhode Island and Martha's Vineyard) at some point in 2023 or earlier, and placed it on the Lynn service. The MBTA acquired the used catamaran Schoodic Explorer (a former whale watching boat and cruise ship tender used in Maine) in 2024 as a spare boat for Lynn service to improve reliability. This boat was later renamed the Frederick Douglass in 2025. The MBTA leases the Winthrop ferry boat from the town. Two more used catamarans were added in 2025 for Winthrop and Quincy service - the Abigail Adams and Harbor Gem (formerly named Mickey Murphy and Curt Berger, respectively, of New York Water Taxi), with the new names selected by elementary school students in a naming competition. A large 400-person catamaran, the Millenium, will be added to the fleet later in 2025 for Hingham service.

=== Finances ===
MBTA boat services have the highest farebox recovery ratio of any MBTA service type – 55% in 2012. However, the service still operated at a $5 million annual loss to the MBTA and carried a relatively small percentage of passengers. In 2012, facing a substantial budget gap, the MBTA proposed substantial service cuts and fare increases. All ferry routes were to be cut, resulting in $3.7 million annual savings. Temporary measures were found to avoid some service cuts including the ferries; however, weekend Quincy service was eliminated and fares were raised 35% in an attempt to eliminate the subsidy required. State lawmakers also then proposed that Massport take over the ferries from the MBTA.

By 2014, farebox recovery increased to 62%. In 2018, the MBTA bid operation of all three routes in a single contract; BHC was the only bidder despite the MBTA's attempts to find a competitor. The cost was originally $17.2 million for the first year with annual increases (with the MBTA keeping all fare revenue); the MBTA negotiated the cost down to $13.6 million. In April 2025, the MBTA awarded BHC a 5 2/3-year, $116 million contract for operating routes F1, F2H, F3, F4, and F5, with two possible three-year extensions.

== Fleet ==
=== MBTA-owned ===
Current vessels owned and in operation for MBTA Ferry service:

MBTA Owned Ferries
Name	Image	Built	Capacity	Primary Route	Primary Ports
Lightning		1996, Gladding-Hearn Shipbuilding	149 passengers	F2H	Boston, Airport, Hingham, Hull
Flying Cloud		1996, Gladding-Hearn Shipbuilding	149 passengers	F2H	Boston, Airport, Hingham Hull
Champion		2017, Gladding-Hearn Shipbuilding	150 passengers	F2H	Boston, Airport, Hingham Hull
Glory		2018, Gladding-Hearn Shipbuilding,	150 passengers	F2H	Boston, Airport, Hingham Hull
Ava Pearl		2012, Gladding-Hearn Shipbuilding	150 passengers	F5	Boston, Lynn
Frederick Douglass (formerly Schoodic Explorer)		2018, Gulf Craft Shipyard	150 passengers	F5	Substitute ferry, rotating routes
Harbor Gem (formerly Curt Berger)		2002, Derecktor Shipyards	101 passengers	F6 and F8	Boston, Winthrop
Abigail Adams (formerly Mickey Murphy)		2002, Derecktor Shipyards	101 passengers	F6 and F8	Boston, Quincy
Millenium		1998, Gladding-Hearn Shipbuilding	400 passengers	F1	Boston, Hingham

=== Contracted ===
Vessels that owned or operated by Boston Harbor City Cruises, and are contracted for MBTA service:

MBTA Contracted Ferries
Name	Image	Built	Capacity	Primary Route	Primary Ports	Notes
Rookie		1979	149 passengers	F4	Boston, Charlestown	Year round
Rita		1982	149 passengers	F4	Boston, Charlestown	Year round
Massachusetts		1988	300 passengers	F1	Boston, Hingham	Owned by Mass Bay Lines, subcontract through Boston Harbor City Cruises, operating on Hingham route since 1991
Nathaniel Bowditch		1994	149 passengers	n/a	Boston, Salem	Seasonal, Commuter hours only, owned by city of Salem
Asteria		1998	400 passengers	F1	Boston, Hingham	Commuter hours only, Whale Watch midday
Aurora		1999	400 passengers	F1	Boston, Hingham	Commuter hours only, Whale Watch midday
Claire		1983	149 passengers	F3	Boston, East Boston	Seasonal, spare Charlestown ferry during winter season
William F. Lisk		1974	49 passengers	F3	Boston, East Boston, Charlestown	Rotating Charlestown and East Boston ferry service
