= Jet Express (ferry line) =

The Jet Express
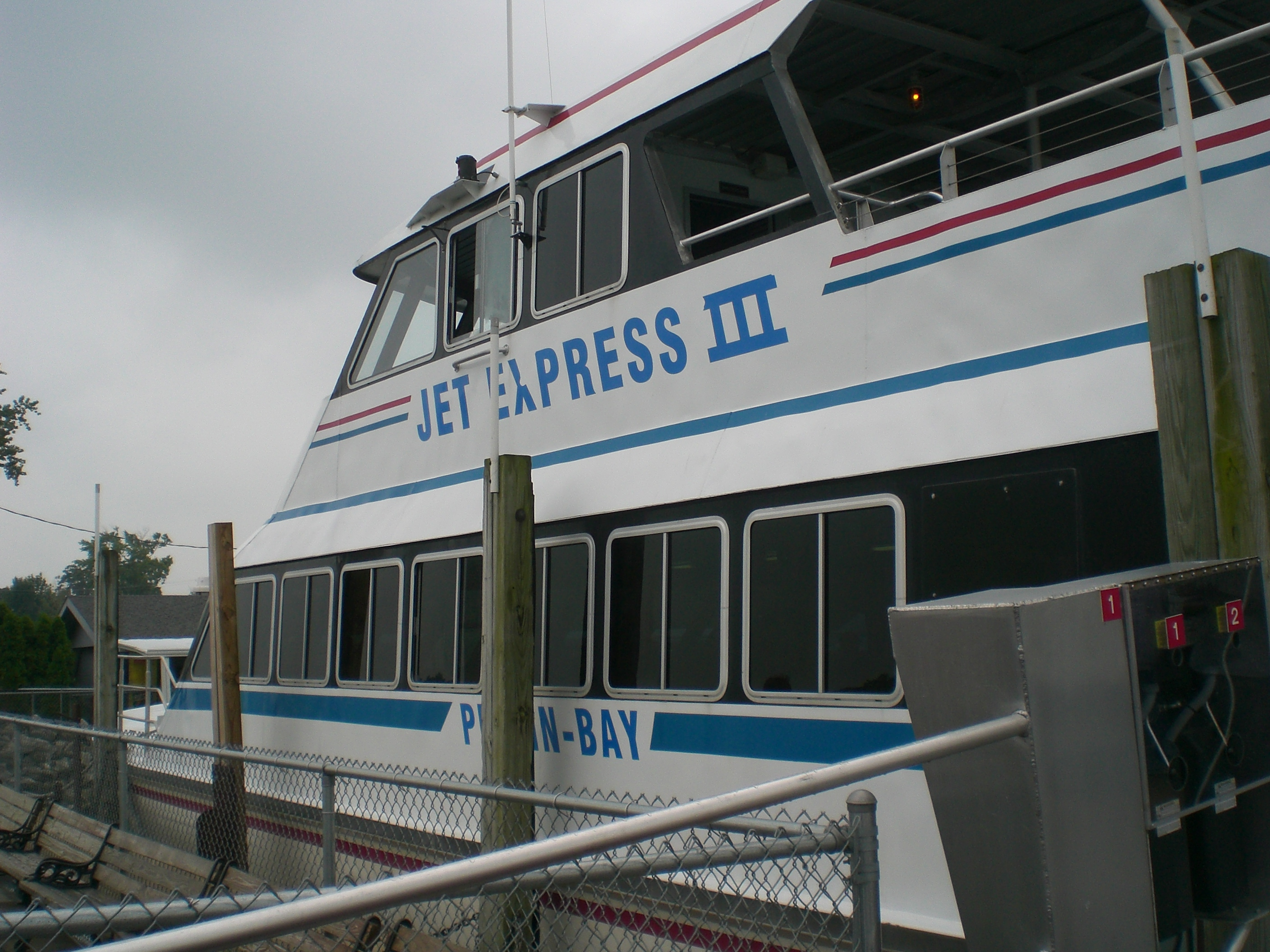
- MV Jet Express III docked at Put-in-Bay, Ohio.
- Locale: Port Clinton, Ohio, Sandusky, Ohio
- Waterway: Portage River, Lake Erie, Sandusky Bay
- Transit type: Ferry
- Owner: Todd Blumensaadt
- Operator: Put-in-Bay Boat Line Company
- Began operation: 1989
- No. of lines: 2
- No. of vessels: 4
- No. of terminals: 5
- Website: jet-express.com

Jet Express Ferry to Put-in-Bay, Kelleys Island & Cedar Point is a high-speed water-jet-powered ferry service departing from mainland ports in Port Clinton, Ohio, and Sandusky, Ohio. It offers service between Port Clinton, Sandusky, Put-in-Bay, Kelleys Island, and Cedar Point. It is one of the fastest ferries in North America, and on Lake Erie, taking as little as 30 minutes to travel the 12.5 mile trip between downtown Port Clinton and downtown Put-in-Bay.

== History ==
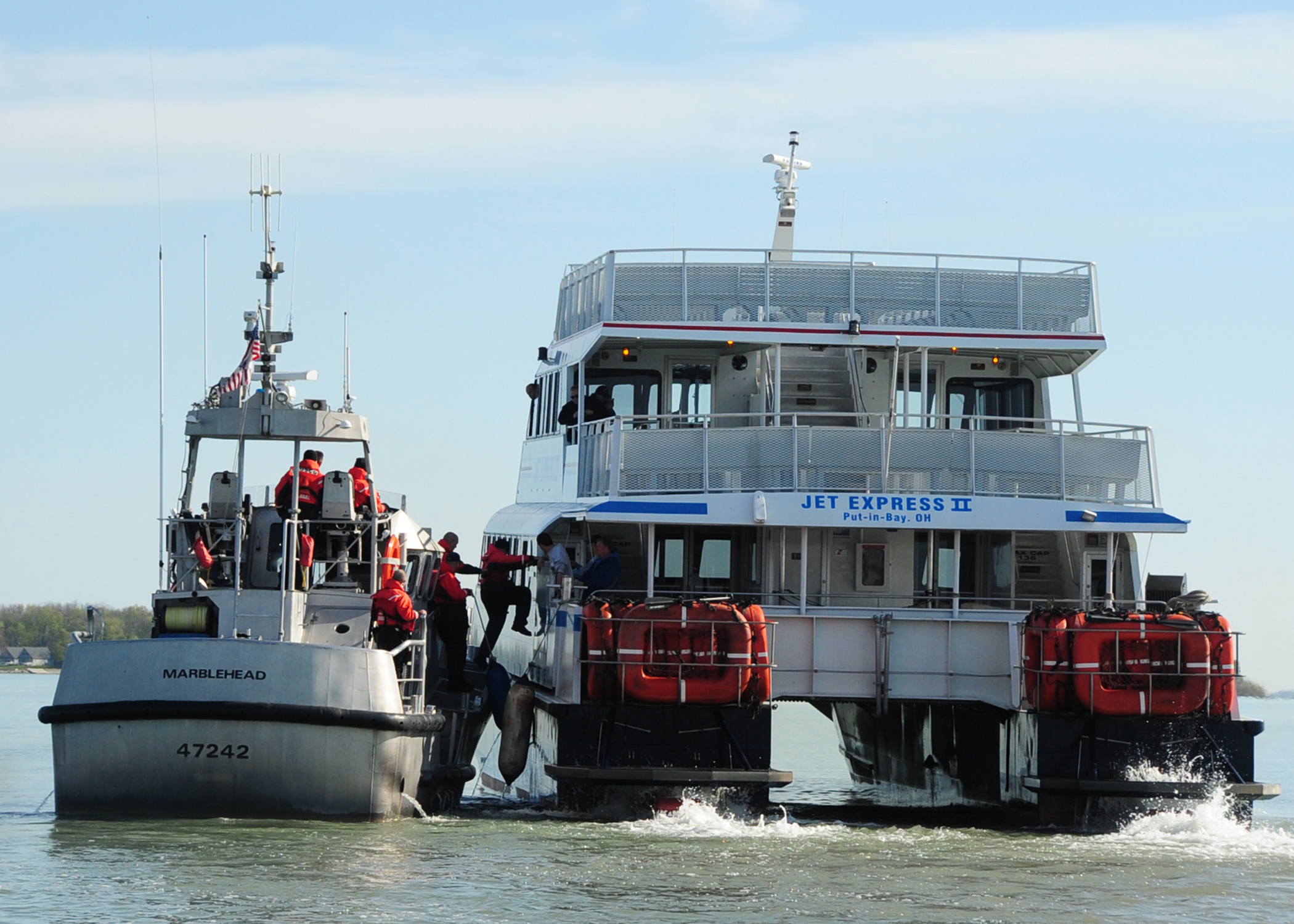
MV Jet Express II during a training exercise with the U.S. Coast Guard Station Marblehead

The Put-in-Bay Boat Line Company "The Jet Express", was founded by Charles "Skip" Duggan in 1988 when he bought out the estate of Captain Alfred Parker who had ran the "Parker Boat Line" for more than 30 years. Today, Todd Blumensaadt is the majority owner of the company.

The company began with a new $3.0 million water-jet-powered catamaran(s), MV Jet Express in May 1989, and soon added the $3.2 million MV Jet Express II in June 1992. A partnership with the Put-in-Bay Port Authority aided in the addition of the $2.0 million MV Jet Express III in July 2002, and in July 2009, a partnership with the Lorain Port Authority added the $1.9 million MV Jet Express IV (constructed in 1995) to the fleet. All four Jet Express vessels were designed in Australia by Incat Designs, and built in the United States by the Gladding-Hearn Shipbuilding, the Duclos Corporation in Somerset, Massachusetts. Jet Express service expanded from the original Port Clinton to Put-in-Bay route to include the mainland port of Sandusky in 2005 from the Jackson Street Pier. The Sandusky route further expanded to include regular service to Kelleys Island, and Put-in-Bay starting in 2006. Service to Cedar Point started in 2016, with regular service to the islands in 2017. The Jet Express fleet of four passenger ferries is available for discounted priced school field trips, private parties, corporate events, and charters. Ports of call include: Cleveland, Toledo, Detroit, and Windsor, Ontario. All trips include a narrated tour. Tickets can be purchased online.

== Fleet of vessels ==
The Jet Express Fleet of Passenger Ferries
Name	Owner	Length	Passenger capacity	Top speed	Builder	Propulsion	Commissioned	Routes operated
MV Jet Express	Put-in-Bay Boat Line Company	92.5 feet	380	38 knots (42 MPH)	Gladding-Hearn Shipbuilding, Somerset, MA	Twin 3600 HP Deutz MWM TBD 620 V12 diesel engines Ka Me Wa (Rolls Royce) 63S waterjets	May 28, 1989	Port Clinton - Put-in-Bay
MV Jet Express II	Put-in-Bay Boat Line Company	98.5 feet	395	38 knots (42 MPH)	Gladding-Hearn Shipbuilding, Somerset, MA	Twin 3600 HP Deutz MWM TBD 620 V12 diesel engines Ka Me Wa (Rolls Royce) 63S waterjets	June 9, 1992	Port Clinton - Put-in-Bay
MV Jet Express III	Put-in-Bay Boat Line Company	88.5 feet	149	30 knots (35 MPH)	Gladding-Hearn Shipbuilding, Somerset, MA	Twin 2800 Caterpillar C32 V12 diesel engines Ka Me Wa (Rolls Royce) FF550 waterjets	July 25, 2002	Sandusky - Cedar Point - Kelleys Island - Put-in-Bay (Inter-Island)
MV Jet Express IV	Put-in-Bay Boat Line Company	88.5 feet	149	33 knots (38 MPH)	Gladding-Hearn Shipbuilding, Somerset, MA	Twin 2800 Caterpillar C32 V12 diesel engines Marine Jet Power waterjets	(December 3, 1995 as MV Grey Lady) July 31, 2009 as MV Jet Express IV	Port Clinton - Put-in-Bay (Stand-by vessel)
