= Adele Y. Schonbrun =

American female ceramic artist

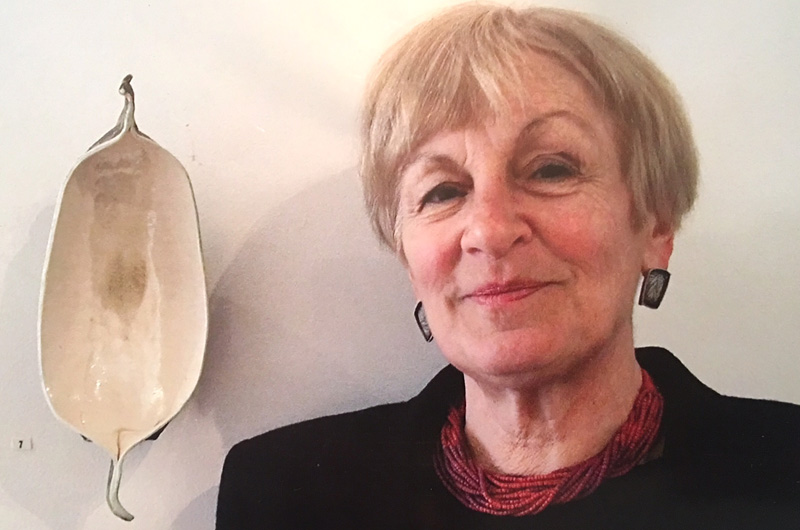
- Born: January 30, 1941; Boston, Massachusetts, U.S.
- Died: May 28, 2017 (aged 76); Oak Bluffs, Massachusetts, U.S.

Adele Y. Schonbrun (January 30, 1941 – May 28, 2017) was an American artist. She worked in various mediums, but is most known for her use of clay as a means of creative expression.

Schonbrun's work is in the permanent collections of museums in France, Japan and the United States. Of note, the Renwick Gallery in the Smithsonian American Art Museum owns Schonbrun's porcelain necktie sculpture, titled T.G.I.F. Her work is also owned by the International Museum of Ceramics in Vallauris, France.

== Early life and education ==
Schonbrun was born in Boston, Massachusetts to Helena Zander Yanco and Renauld Theodore Yanco. In 1958, she graduated from Roslindale High School located in the Roslindale neighborhood of Boston.

She received her Bachelor of Fine Arts in 1962 from the Rhode Island School of Design and a Masters of Fine Arts in 1965 from Claremont Graduate School at Scripps College where she studied ceramics with Paul Soldner. Schonbrun remained intrigued by Soldner's ongoing endeavors to shift ceramics from its utilitarian and practical origins toward forms of imaginative and deeply personal artistic expression.

== Career ==
In 1984, Schonbrun won third place in the Biennale Internationale de Ceramique d'Art in Vallauris, France, receiving 5,000 francs (then equivalent to $850) in prize money. Her award winning piece, an elaborate porcelain bed, became part of the permanent collection of Magnelli Museum, the Museum of Ceramics, Vallauris, France, which sponsors the competition. The competition strives to inspire, endorse, and recognize gifted ceramic artists. It aims to highlight the multifaceted applications of this medium, and commemorate the artistic expressions that encompass various prevailing trends.

She lived in Berkeley Heights in Union County, New Jersey, before moving with her family to Colorado in 1984, just before winning the third place award.

Schonbrun taught ceramics at Berea College, Colorado College, and Connecticut College.

She has exhibited in Windsor Connecticut in 2011.

== Personal life ==
Schönbrun was married to Stanley Schonbrun. They have two daughters, Heather Klinck of Union Springs, AL, and Serena Connelly, of Pleasantville, NY and a grandson, Odin Barnaby Connelly.

As a child, Schonbrun lived in Boston and summered on Martha's Vineyard Massachusetts. She also lived in California, New Jersey, Connecticut, Colorado, and briefly in Seattle, WA. In the early 1990s she and her husband relocated from Seattle to Martha's Vineyard, where she spent her final decades. In 2017, she died in Oak Bluffs, on Martha's Vineyard from Alzheimer's disease.
