= MV Grey Lady =

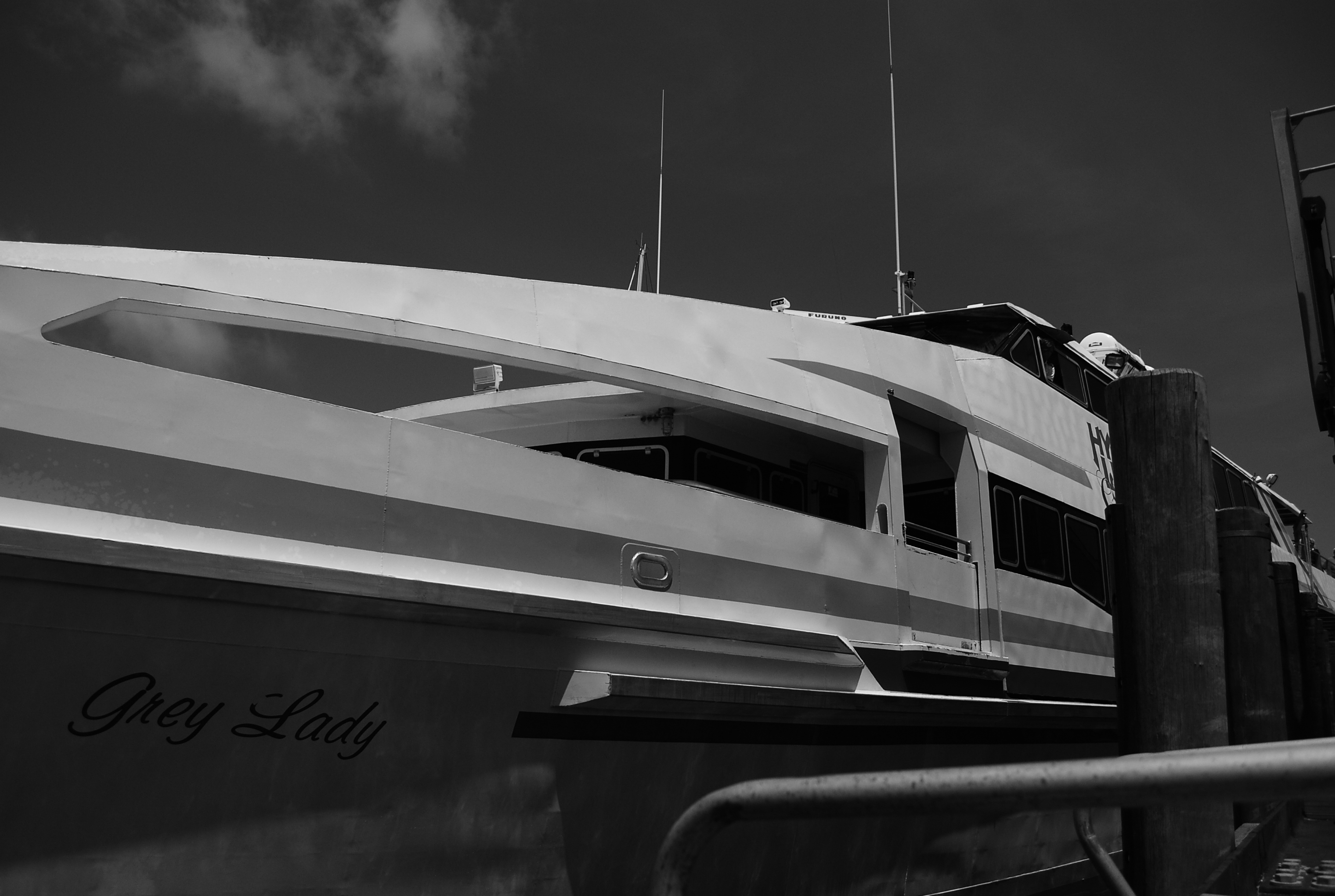
A close up quartering view of Grey Lady at dock

MV Grey Lady is a high speed catamaran ferry operated by Hy-Line Cruises that travels on a route between Hyannis and Nantucket.

The vessel was designed by Incat Crowther and ordered from Gladding-Hearn Shipbuilding in February 2002. While she was originally to be named Grey Lady III, following two previous ferries of that name, when she was delivered in May 2003 she bore the name Grey Lady. She is the third Incat ferry to be operated by Hy-Line, preceded by Grey Lady II (now Lady Martha) and succeeded by Grey Lady IV.

Grey Lady is 144 feet (44 m) long, with a beam of 35 feet (11 m) and a draft of 6.5 feet (2.0 m). She displaces 142 Long Tons and is 86 Gross Tons. Her speed comes from four KTA50M2 Cummins diesel engines spinning four Hamilton water jets through Reinjtes gearboxes. The engines can propel her at up to 38 knots (44 mph), though her normal service speed is 31 knots (36 mph). She has a passenger capacity of 300.
