= Emma Chambers Maitland =

American dancer, teacher and boxer

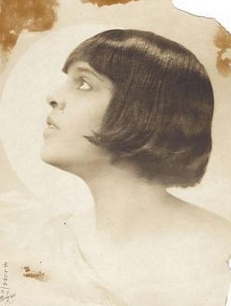
- Photograph of Emma Chambers Maitland, published in a 1924 newspaper.
- Born: Jane Chambers; 1893; Virginia
- Died: March 1975 (aged 81–82); Massachusetts
- Occupations: Performer, boxer, teacher
- Years active: 1920s-1950s

Emma Chambers Maitland (1893 – March 1975), born Jane Chambers, was an American dancer, teacher, and boxer.

== Early life ==
Jane Chambers was born near Richmond, Virginia, the daughter of Wyatt Chambers and Cora Chambers. Her parents were sharecroppers, and she had seven brothers. She was educated at a convent school at Rock Castle, Virginia, and qualified as a teacher. She changed her first name when she moved to Washington, D.C. as a young woman.

== Career ==
Chambers was a teacher as a young woman in Virginia. As a widow with a young daughter to support, Maitland moved to Paris. She danced at the Moulin Rouge, modeled for artists, and did a boxing act with another American performer, Aurelia Wheedlin (or Wheeldin). She became serious about boxing, trained with American boxer Jack Taylor, and toured with Wheedlin in Europe, billed as the world's lightweight female boxing champion. She also boxed in Canada, Cuba and Mexico.

Maitland moved back to the United States in 1926, lived in New York City, and continued performing as a "boxeuse". She appeared (often with Wheedlin) in clubs, in vaudeville and on the New York stage in black revues, including Messin' Around (1929), Change Your Luck (1930), and Fast and Furious (1931). She worked as a bodyguard and taught dance and gymnastics. In her later years she moved to Martha's Vineyard.

== Personal life and legacy ==
Emma Maitland married a Howard University medical student, Clarence Maitland. They had a daughter together in 1917. Clarence Maitland died from tuberculosis within a year of their wedding. She died in early 1975, aged 82.

Maitland donated her papers and souvenirs to the Schomburg Collection at the New York Public Library, in 1943. In 2015, Maitland's former home in Oak Bluffs became a stop on the African American Heritage Trail of Martha’s Vineyard. In 2020, she was the subject of an exhibit at the Martha's Vineyard Museum.
