= East Chop =

Place in Massachusetts, USA

Coordinates: 41°28′03.67″N 70°34′07.03″W

East Chop, also known as the Vineyard Highlands, is a residential area located in the town of Oak Bluffs, Massachusetts on the north end of the island of Martha's Vineyard. It is a peninsula surrounded on the North and East by Vineyard Sound and on the West by Vineyard Haven Harbor, and features the high, prominent bluffs that gave Oak Bluffs its name. A lighthouse, East Chop Light, stands at the north end of the chop on Telegraph Hill.

East Chop has no obvious commercial businesses or stores, although it has a private yacht and beach club, the East Chop Beach Club.

East Chop became a popular summer resort in the late 19th century. A steamship wharf, known as Highland Landing or Highland Wharf, served regular ferry traffic from the mainland during the 1890s, and a horse railroad connected it to the village of Cottage City, later renamed Oak Bluffs. East Chop and the Highlands became a popular camp meeting gathering ground for Baptists, and church members erected a wooden tabernacle in 1877. The remains can still be seen in Temple Park.
