= Oak Bluffs, Massachusetts =

Oak Bluffs, Massachusetts Ogkeshkuppe
- Town
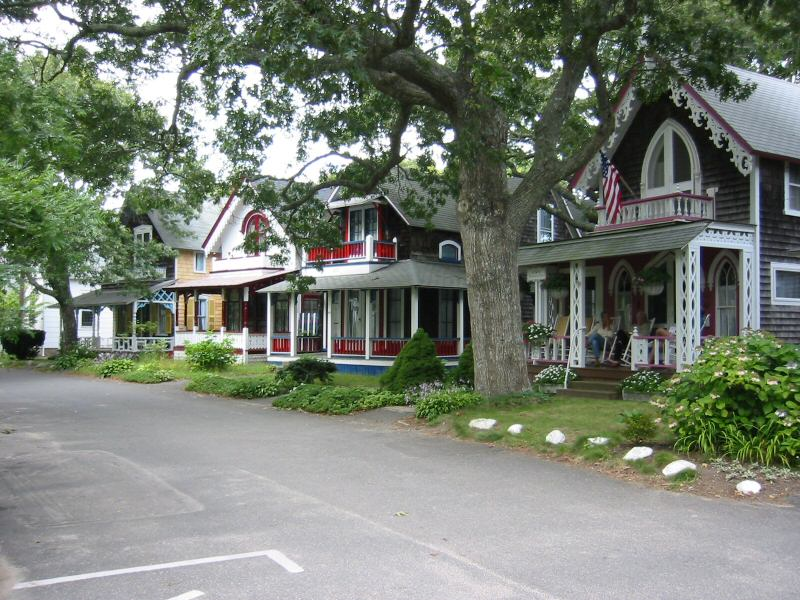
- A row of cottages in the Campground area

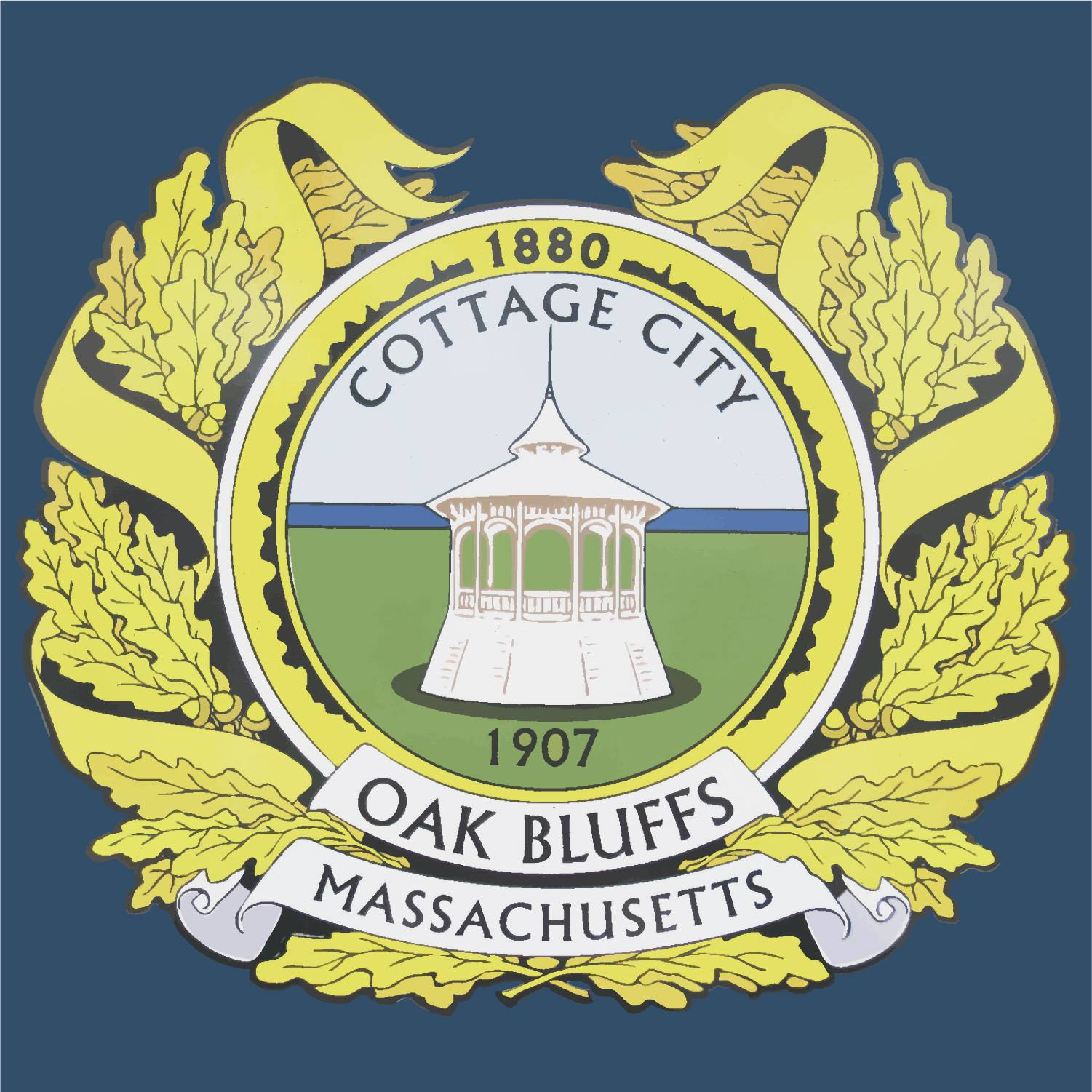
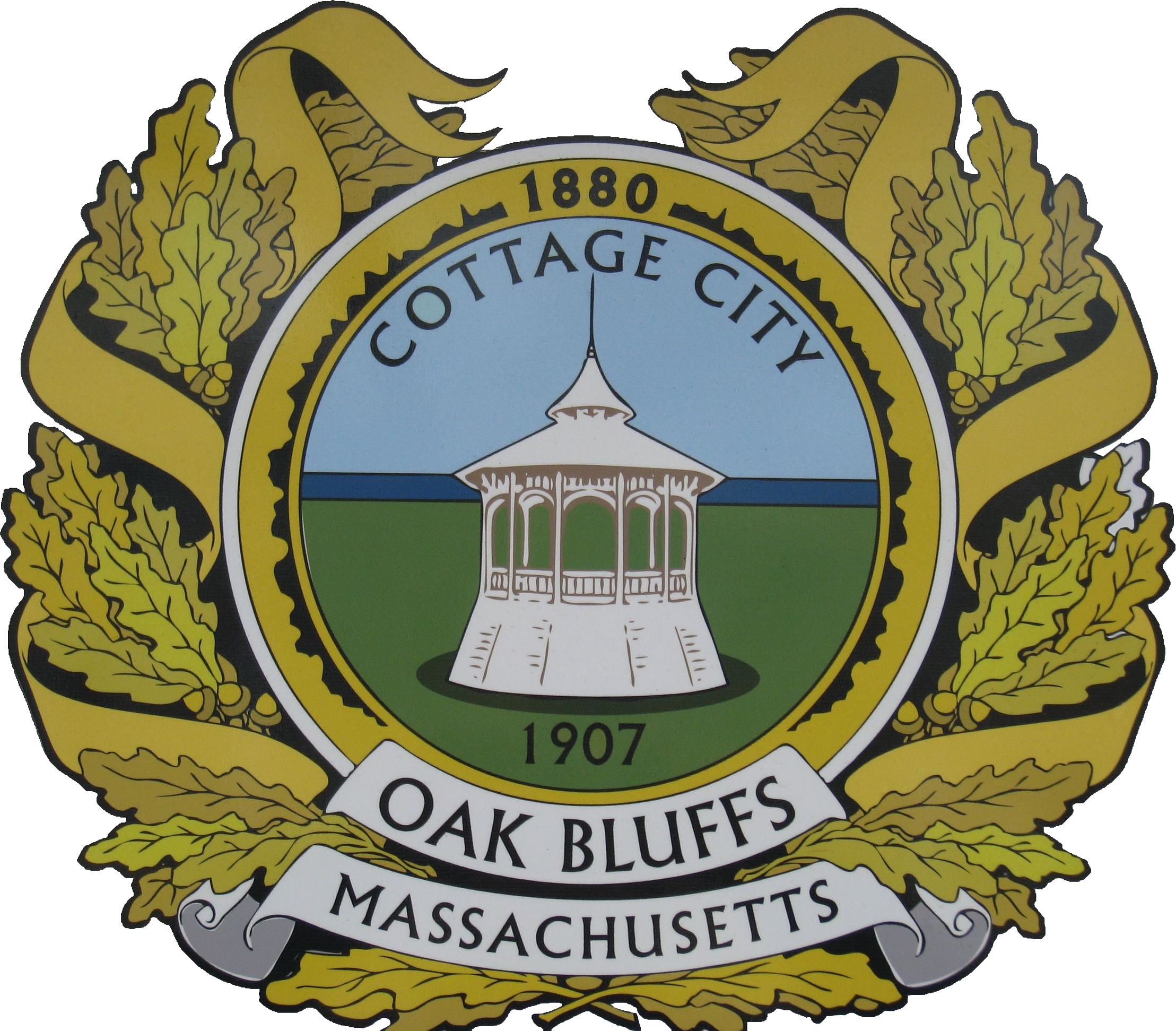
- Flag Seal

- Location in Dukes County in Massachusetts
- Coordinates: 41°27′15″N 70°33′45″W
- Country: United States
- State: Massachusetts
- County: Dukes
- Settled by Europeans: 1642
- Incorporated: February 17, 1880
- Name Change: January 25, 1907

Government
  - Type: Open town meeting
  - Town Administrator: Wendy Brough

Area
  - Total: 25.9 sq mi (67.2 km^{2})
  - Land: 7.4 sq mi (19.1 km^{2})
  - Water: 18.6 sq mi (48.1 km^{2})
- Elevation: 30 ft (9 m)

Population (2020)
  - Total: 5,341
  - Density: 724/sq mi (280/km^{2})
- Time zone: UTC−5 (Eastern)
  - Summer (DST): UTC−4 (Eastern)
- ZIP Codes: 02557 (Oak Bluffs); 02568 (Vineyard Haven)
- Area code: 508/774
- FIPS code: 25-50390
- GNIS feature ID: 0619442
- Website: www.oakbluffsma.gov

Oak Bluffs is a town on Martha's Vineyard in Massachusetts. The population was 5,341 at the 2020 United States census. The town contains the census-designated place of the same name. It is one of the island's principal points of arrival for summer tourists, and is noted for its "gingerbread cottages" and other well-preserved mid- to late-nineteenth-century buildings. The town has been a historically important center of African American culture since the 18th century.

== History ==
The first inhabitants of Oak Bluffs were the Wampanoag people, who have lived on Martha's Vineyard (Wampanoag name: Noepe) for approximately 10,000 years. The area that is now Oak Bluffs was called "Ogkeshkuppe," which means "damp/wet thicket or woods."

The area was later settled by Europeans in 1642 and was part of Edgartown until 1880, when it was officially incorporated as Cottage City. The town re-incorporated in 1907 as Oak Bluffs, named because the town was the site of an oak grove along the bluffs overlooking Nantucket Sound. Oak Bluffs was the only one of the six towns on the island to be consciously planned, and the only one developed specifically with tourism in mind.

People of African descent first arrived on Martha's Vineyard in the 1600s as enslaved West Africans who worked on the farms of European settlers. The Oak Bluffs harbor drew freed slaves, laborers and sailors in the 18th century, and white locals sold them land. After slavery was abolished, the freed blacks came to work in the fishing industries, in turn drawing black residents from the Massachusetts mainland, who came and started businesses to serve the Vineyard's growing population. In the 1800s some black laborers also worked as servants to wealthy white families and in the hotels. In the late 19th and 20th centuries, middle-class blacks bought or rented summer homes, and many of their descendants returned annually. Formerly enslaved people, or their descendants, bought property around Baptist Temple Park in the early 20th century, drawn by the religious services held there. Teachers, politicians, lawyers, doctors, artists, musicians and entrepreneurs resided there for decades afterward.

Affluent African Americans from New York, Boston, and Washington came to Oak Bluffs, the only Martha's Vineyard town that welcomed black tourists as other towns on the island did not allow black guests to stay in inns and hotels until the 1960s. Many bought houses in an area they called the Oval or the Highlands, which Harlem Renaissance writer Dorothy West wrote about in her 1995 novel, The Wedding (edited by Doubleday editor Jacqueline Kennedy Onassis, a Vineyard resident who visited West for two summers). By the 1930s, local black landowners were transforming the town into the country's best-known and most exclusive African American vacation spot. Down the road from West, Adam Clayton Powell Jr. owned a cottage in the Oval where Arctic explorer Matthew Henson was a guest. Further down the road is Shearer Cottage, the first inn for African Americans vacationers. It was built by a Charles Shearer, the son of a slave and a slave owner, when Shearer saw that black visitors were not able to stay at the homes due to segregation. Guests at the inn included the first self-made American millionairess Madame CJ Walker, singers Paul Robeson, Ethel Waters and Lillian Evanti; and composer Harry T. Burleigh.

In 1866, Robert Morris Copeland was hired by a group of New England developers to design a planned residential community in Martha's Vineyard. The site, a large, rolling, treeless pasture overlooking Nantucket Sound, was adjacent to the immensely popular Methodist camp meeting, Wesleyan Grove, a curving network of narrow streets lined with quaint "Carpenter's Gothic" cottages, picket fences, and pocket parks. Seeking to take advantage of the camp's seasonal popularity (and overflowing population), the developers established Oak Bluffs Land and Wharf Company, gaining immediate success: Five hundred lots were sold between 1868 and 1871. Copeland would end up creating three plans for the community to accommodate its constant expansion. Oak Bluffs is one of the earliest planned residential communities and largely informed later suburban development in the United States.

Some of the earliest visitors to the area that became Cottage City and later Oak Bluffs were Methodists, who gathered in the oak grove known as Wesleyan Grove each summer for multi-day religious "camp meetings" held under large tents and in the open air.

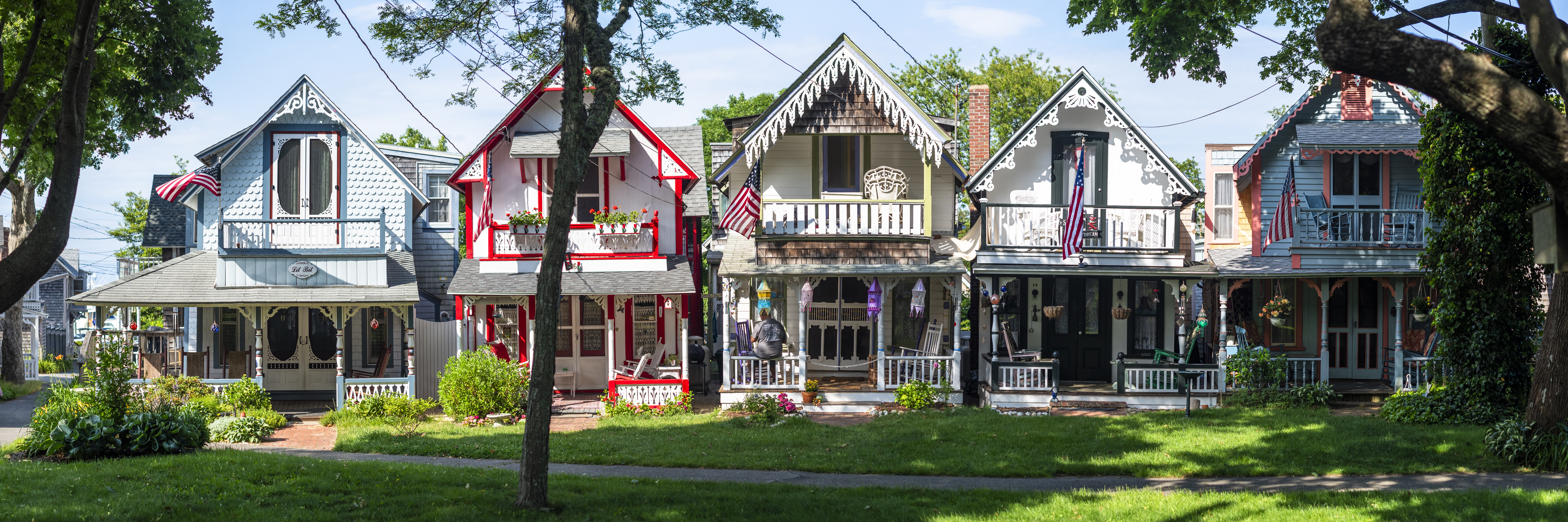
Gingerbread Cottages at Wesleyan Grove

As families returned to the grove year after year, tents pitched on the ground gave way to tents pitched on wooden platforms and eventually to small wooden cottages. Small in scale and closely packed, the cottages grew more elaborate over time. Porches, balconies, elaborate door and window frames became common, as did complex wooden scrollwork affixed to the roof edges as decorative trim. The unique "gingerbread" or "Carpenter's Gothic" architectural style of the cottages was often accented by the owner's use of bright, multi-hue paint schemes, and gave the summer cottages a quaint, almost storybook look. Dubbed "gingerbread cottages," they became a tourist attraction in their own right in the late nineteenth century. So, too, did the Tabernacle: a circular, open-sided pavilion covered by a metal roof supported by tall wrought iron columns, erected in the late 1880s, which became a venue for services and community events. The campground's gingerbread cottages are cherished historic landmarks as well as very expensive real estate. Many are still family owned and passed on generation to generation. The cottages and the Tabernacle were added to the National Register of Historic Places in 1978, recognized in 2000 by the National Trust for Historic Preservation and declared a National Historic Landmark by the US Department of the Interior in 2005.

Nineteenth-century tourists, arriving by steamer from the mainland, could also choose from a wide range of secular attractions: shops, restaurants, ice cream parlors, dance halls, band concerts, walks along seaside promenades, or swims in the waters of Nantucket Sound. Resort hotels, of which the Wesley House is the sole surviving example, lined the waterfront and the bluffs. For a time, a narrow-gauge railway carried curious travelers from the steamship wharf in Oak Bluffs to Edgartown, running along tracks laid on what is now Joseph Sylvia State Beach. In 1884, the Flying Horses Carousel was brought to Oak Bluffs from Coney Island and installed a few blocks inland from the ocean, where it remains in operation today. Built in 1876, it is the oldest platform carousel still in operation. Like the grounds and buildings of the Campground (so designated in April 2005), the Flying Horses were designated a National Historic Landmark by the Secretary of the Interior.

The Martha's Vineyard Summer Institute was established in 1878, being the first summer school for teachers in the U.S.

In 1873, the neighboring community of Harthaven was established by William H. Hart when he purchased a lot from the Oak Bluffs Land and Wharf Company. The community later moved in 1911 to its present location between Oak Bluffs town and Edgartown.

== Geography ==
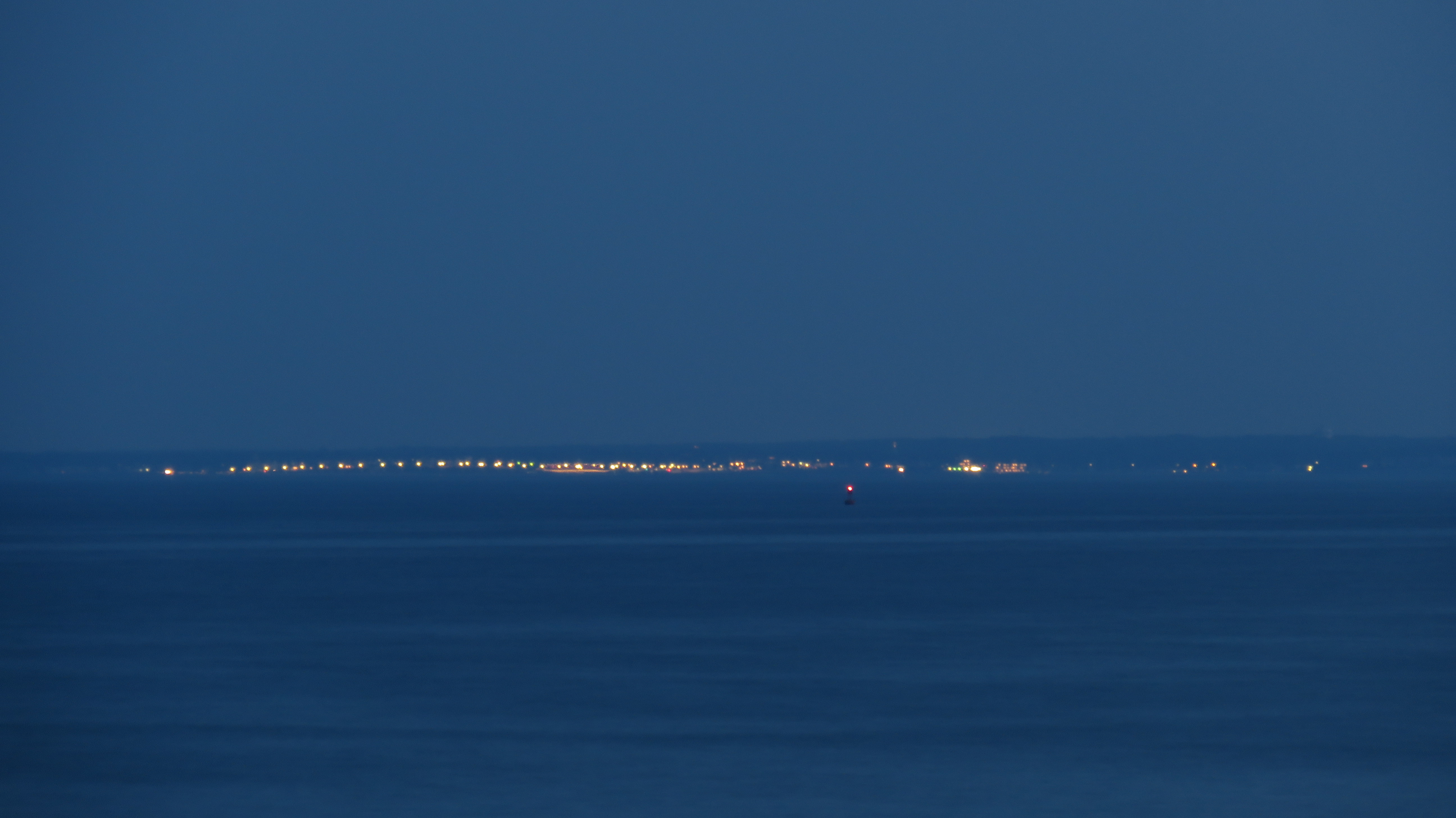
The lights of Oak Bluffs at twilight viewed from Mashpee (about 9 miles/14.5 km distant)

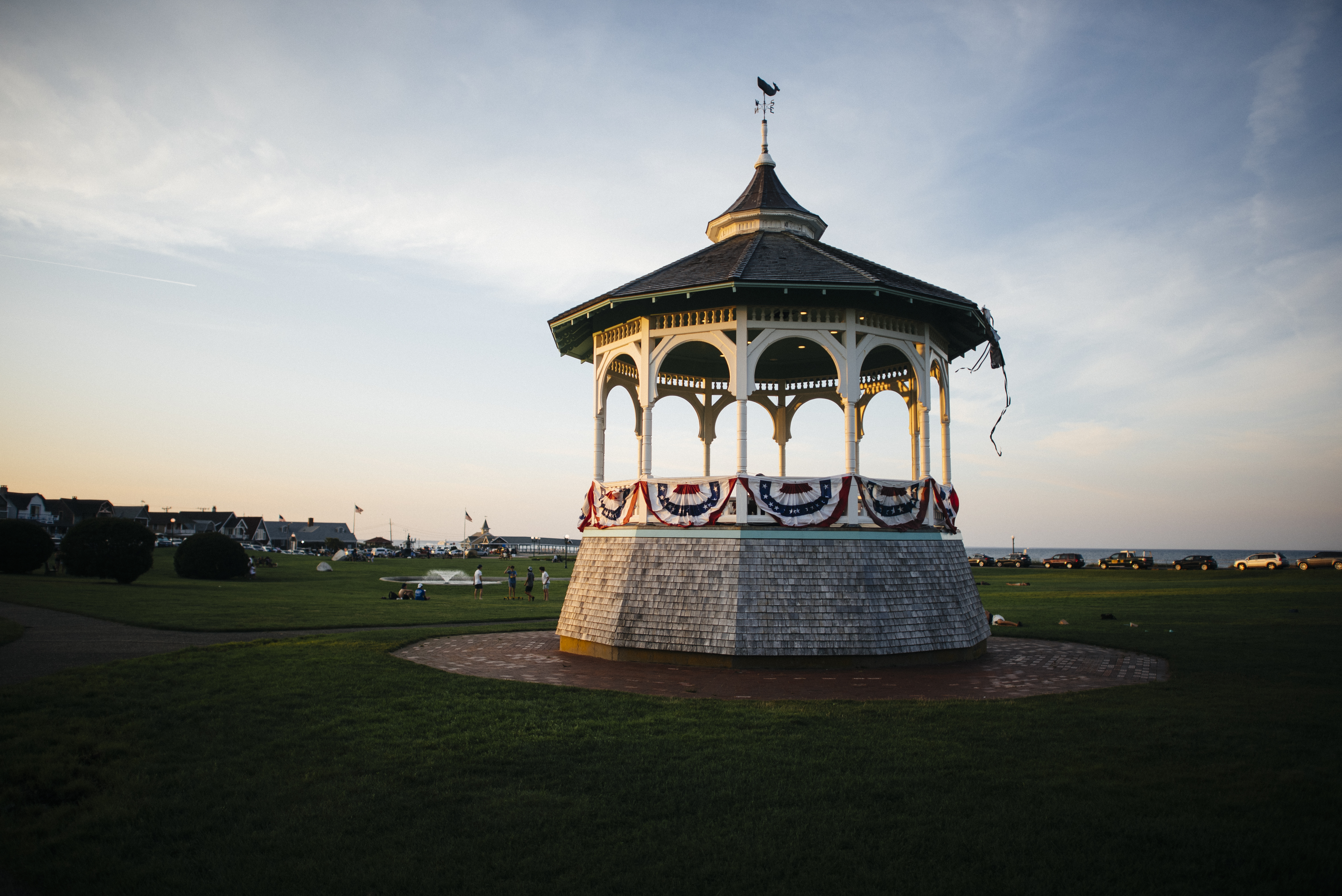
Ocean Park Bandstand, Oak Bluffs

According to the United States Census Bureau, the town has a total area of 26.0 square miles (67 km^{2}), of which 7.4 square miles (19 km^{2}) is land and 18.6 square miles (48 km^{2}) (71.61%) is water. In terms of land area, the town is 323rd out of 351 communities in the Commonwealth, and the third smallest community (behind Aquinnah and Tisbury) in Dukes County. Oak Bluffs is bordered by Nantucket Sound to the north and east, Edgartown to the south, and Vineyard Haven Harbor, Lagoon Pond and Tisbury to the west. It also shares a common corner, along with Tisbury and Edgartown, with West Tisbury.

The northernmost point of the town, East Chop, is just over five miles from the mainland. The town shares Sengekontacket Pond with Edgartown, with the town's land ending at Sarson's Island, but wrapping around the waters around Felix Neck into Major's Cove. The highest points in town are between Sengekontacket and Lagoon Ponds, and west of Lagoon Pond in the irregular triangle of land which juts into Tisbury.

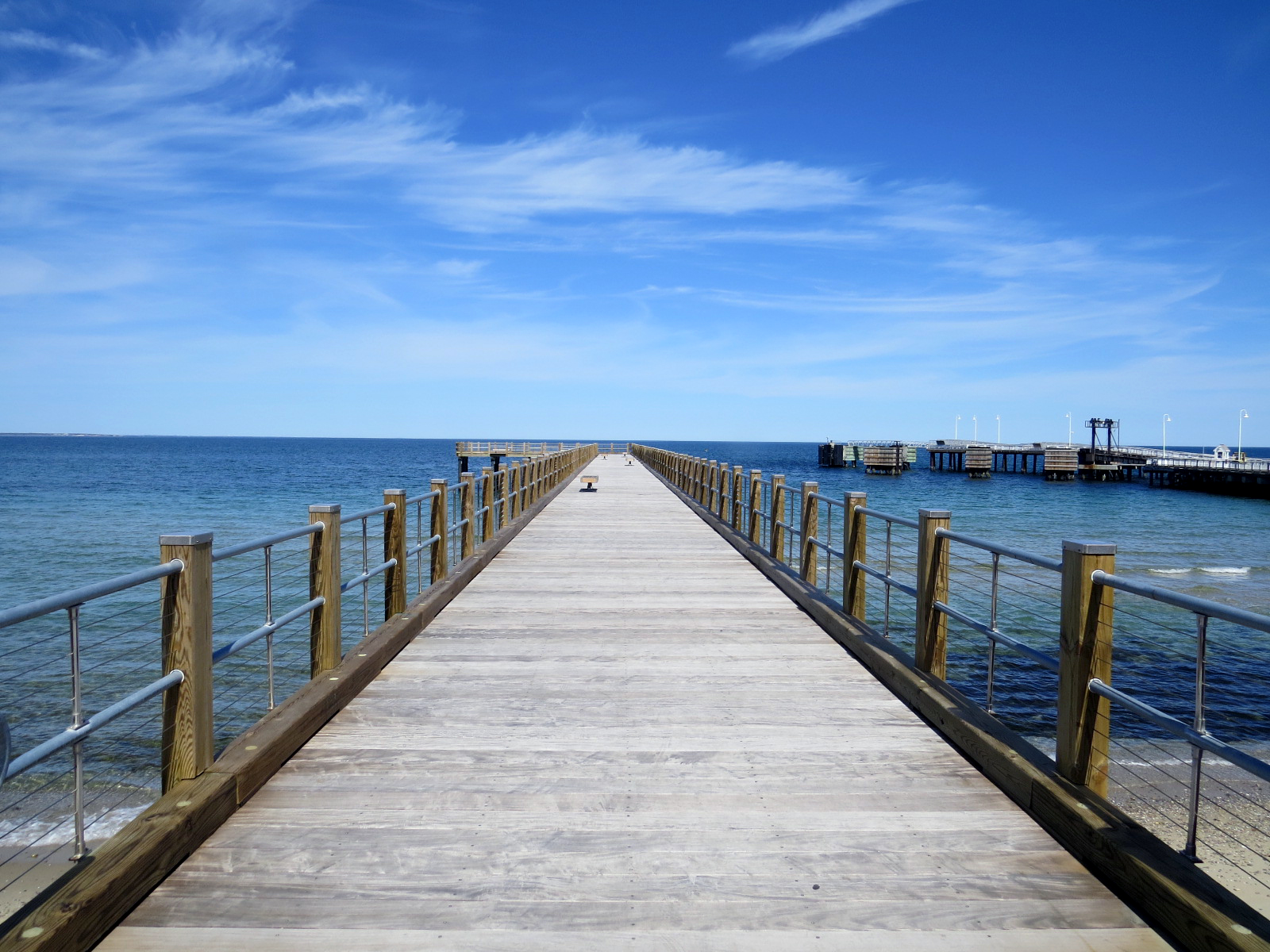
Oak Bluffs Fishing Pier

There are four public beaches in the town: Eastville Beach, facing Vineyard Haven Harbor and adjacent to the entrance to Lagoon Pond; Oak Bluffs Town Beach or The "Inkwell" is the name of the popular beach frequented by African Americans beginning in the late nineteenth century. The strand was pejoratively called "The Inkwell" by nearby whites in reference to the skin color of the beach-goers. It is the most famous of beaches across the U.S. to transform this odious nickname into an emblem of pride, bordering Nantucket Sound just south of the Steamship Authority Pier; Hart Haven Beach, further to the south; and Joseph Sylvia State Beach, a barrier beach (shared by Oak Bluffs and Edgartown) that separates Sengekontacket Pond from Nantucket Sound. State Beach is punctuated by two inlets that connect the pond to the ocean. The smaller of the two is spanned by the Veterans of Foreign Wars Bridge, which lies wholly within Oak Bluffs, and the larger by the American Legion Bridge, the midpoint of which is the boundary between Oak Bluffs and Edgartown. The formal names of the bridges are generally ignored by residents in favor of the traditional designations "Little Bridge" and "Big Bridge."

Oak Bluffs has a small, tightly enclosed harbor that draws large numbers of recreational boaters, and serves as a year-round home port to a small number of fishing boats. Seasonal passenger ferries to Falmouth, Hyannis, and Nantucket dock along the east side of the harbor, as does a high-speed ferry to Quonset Point, RI. The seasonal car-and-truck-ferry service operated by the Woods Hole, Martha's Vineyard and Nantucket Steamship Authority docks outside the harbor, at a long pier projecting into Nantucket Sound, as does the fast ferry that provides seasonal service to New Bedford. The exposed nature of the pier means that Steamship Authority ferries are routinely diverted to Vineyard Haven during strong northeasterly winds. Oak Bluffs is also the site of Trade Winds Airport, a private grass landing strip located just north of Sengekontacket Pond.

=== Climate ===
According to the Köppen climate classification, Oak Bluffs has a temperate oceanic climate (abbreviated Cfb), closely bordering on a hot-summer humid sub-tropical climate (abbreviated Cfa).

Climate data for Oak Bluffs, 1991–2020 simulated normals (33 ft elevation)
Month	Jan	Feb	Mar	Apr	May	Jun	Jul	Aug	Sep	Oct	Nov	Dec	Year
Mean daily maximum °F (°C)	39.6 (4.2)	40.3 (4.6)	45.1 (7.3)	54.1 (12.3)	62.8 (17.1)	71.6 (22.0)	78.4 (25.8)	78.3 (25.7)	72.7 (22.6)	63.0 (17.2)	53.4 (11.9)	45.0 (7.2)	58.7 (14.8)
Daily mean °F (°C)	32.2 (0.1)	32.9 (0.5)	37.9 (3.3)	46.8 (8.2)	55.6 (13.1)	64.8 (18.2)	71.4 (21.9)	71.2 (21.8)	65.5 (18.6)	55.6 (13.1)	46.4 (8.0)	37.9 (3.3)	51.5 (10.8)
Mean daily minimum °F (°C)	24.8 (−4.0)	25.5 (−3.6)	30.9 (−0.6)	39.4 (4.1)	48.6 (9.2)	57.9 (14.4)	64.6 (18.1)	64.0 (17.8)	58.1 (14.5)	48.2 (9.0)	39.2 (4.0)	30.9 (−0.6)	44.3 (6.9)
Average precipitation inches (mm)	4.19 (106.30)	3.65 (92.65)	5.02 (127.60)	4.30 (109.19)	3.49 (88.67)	3.39 (86.01)	2.76 (70.22)	3.59 (91.09)	3.90 (99.07)	4.67 (118.50)	4.17 (106.04)	5.03 (127.78)	48.16 (1,223.12)
Average dew point °F (°C)	22.8 (−5.1)	23.2 (−4.9)	27.3 (−2.6)	36.3 (2.4)	46.6 (8.1)	57.0 (13.9)	64.2 (17.9)	63.5 (17.5)	57.6 (14.2)	46.9 (8.3)	37.2 (2.9)	28.9 (−1.7)	42.6 (5.9)
Source: PRISM Climate Group

== Demographics ==
Historical population
Year	Pop.	±%
1880	672	—
1890	1,080	+60.7%
1900	1,100	+1.9%
1910	1,084	−1.5%
1920	1,047	−3.4%
1930	1,333	+27.3%
1940	1,584	+18.8%
1950	1,521	−4.0%
1960	1,419	−6.7%
1970	1,385	−2.4%
1980	1,984	+43.2%
1990	2,804	+41.3%
2000	3,713	+32.4%
2010	4,527	+21.9%
2020	5,341	+18.0%
2022*	5,379	+0.7%
* = population estimate. Source: United States Census records and Population Estimates Program data.

=== 2020 census ===
Oak Bluffs town, Massachusetts – Racial and ethnic composition Note: the US Census treats Hispanic/Latino as an ethnic category. This table excludes Latinos from the racial categories and assigns them to a separate category. Hispanics/Latinos may be of any race.
Race / Ethnicity (NH = Non-Hispanic)	Pop 2000	Pop 2010	Pop 2020	% 2000	% 2010	% 2020
White alone (NH)	3,196	3,737	3,918	86.08%	82.55%	73.36%
Black or African American alone (NH)	157	209	386	4.23%	4.62%	7.23%
Native American or Alaska Native alone (NH)	55	41	55	1.48%	0.91%	1.03%
Asian alone (NH)	24	52	56	0.65%	1.15%	1.05%
Native Hawaiian or Pacific Islander alone (NH)	0	1	6	0.00%	0.02%	0.11%
Other race alone (NH)	82	167	218	2.21%	3.69%	4.08%
Mixed race or Multiracial (NH)	155	210	568	4.17%	4.64%	10.63%
Hispanic or Latino (any race)	44	110	134	1.19%	2.43%	2.51%
Total	3,713	4,527	5,341	100.00%	100.00%	100.00%

As of the census of 2000, there were 3,713 people, 1,590 households, and 914 families residing in the town. The population density was 504.1 inhabitants per square mile (194.6/km^{2}). There were 3,820 housing units at an average density of 518.6 per square mile (200.2/km^{2}). The racial makeup of the town was 86.72% White, 4.31% African American, 1.51% Native American, 0.67% Asian, 2.50% from other races, and 4.28% from two or more races. Hispanic or Latino of any race were 1.19% of the population.

Like other towns in Southeastern Massachusetts, Oak Bluffs has had a large Portuguese-American population since the late 19th century. Many of these town residents were originally from the island of Faial in the Azores, and the neighborhood where many of them lived, located between Vineyard Avenue and Wing Rd, was once nicknamed Fayal. Today the town's Portuguese heritage is best appreciated at the Annual Portuguese Feast, held at the Portuguese-American Club on Vineyard Avenue in mid-July.

There were 1,590 households, out of which 27.7% had children under the age of 18 living with them, 44.3% were married couples living together, 9.4% had a female householder with no husband present, 42.5% were non-families, 32.6% were made up of individuals, and 13.0% had someone living alone who was 65 years of age or older. The average household size was 2.33 and the average family size was 2.94.

In the town, the population was spread out, with 22.6% under the age of 18, 6.0% from 18 to 24, 31.9% from 25 to 44, 24.8% from 45 to 64, and 14.8% who were 65 years of age or older. The median age was 39 years. For every 100 females, there were 94.3 males. For every 100 females age 18 and over, there were 93.2 males.

The median income for a household in the town was $42,044, and the median income for a family was $53,841. Males had a median income of $39,113 versus $31,797 for females. The per capita income for the town was $23,829. About 6.2% of families and 8.4% of the population were below the poverty line, including 13.0% of those under age 18 and 8.5% of those age 65 or over.

Oak Bluffs ranks 263rd in population in the Commonwealth of Massachusetts, and third in Dukes County (behind Edgartown and Tisbury). It is 173rd in the Commonwealth of Massachusetts in terms of population density, and second behind Tisbury in Dukes County.

== Government ==
On the national level, Oak Bluffs is a part of Massachusetts's 9th congressional district, and is currently represented by Bill Keating. Massachusetts is currently represented in the United States Senate by Senators Elizabeth Warren and Ed Markey.

On the state level, Oak Bluffs is represented in the Massachusetts House of Representatives as a part of the Barnstable, Dukes and Nantucket district, which includes all of Martha's Vineyard and Nantucket, as well as a portion of Falmouth. The town is represented in the Massachusetts Senate as a portion of the Cape and Islands district, which includes all of Martha's Vineyard, Nantucket and most of Barnstable County (with the exception of Bourne, Sandwich, Falmouth and Mashpee). The town is home to the Fifth Barracks of Troop D of the Massachusetts State Police, which serves all of Dukes County.

Oak Bluffs is governed on the local level by the open town meeting form of government, and is led by a board of selectmen. The town has its own police and fire departments, with the police being located near Oak Bluffs Harbor and the fire department being more centrally located in the town. The post office is located just east of the Vineyard Camp Meeting Association lands, as is Oak Bluffs Public Library, which is a member of the Cape Libraries Automated Materials Sharing library network. Oak Bluffs is also home to Martha's Vineyard Hospital, just northeast of the Lagoon, which serves all of the island.

== Notable people ==
- Edward W. Brooke, former Massachusetts Senator who was the first black senator after Reconstruction and the first from the Northern United States
- Bebe Moore Campbell, writer
- Stephen L. Carter, Yale law professor and writer. Carter based his first novel, The Emperor of Ocean Park, in Oak Bluffs
- Suzzanne Douglas Cobb, actress, singer, dancer
- Henry Louis Gates Jr., professor, author, and filmmaker
- Charlayne Hunter-Gault, journalist and author
- Lani Guinier, professor and former nominee for assistant attorney general for civil rights
- Sunny Hostin, lawyer, author, and television host. Hostin based her first novel, Summer on the Bluffs, in Oak Bluffs
- Reggie Hudlin, filmmaker
- William Jackson, Baptist minister, abolitionist, and Union army chaplain
- Valerie Jarrett, senior advisor to President Obama
- Vernon Jordan, lawyer and former presidential advisor
- Martin Luther King Jr., civil rights movement activist and Nobel Peace Prize laureate
- Spike Lee, filmmaker and his wife, Tonya Lewis Lee, a lawyer and television producer
- Emma Chambers Maitland, dancer and boxer
- Helen Manning, Native American historian, activist and writer, taught at Oak Bluffs School from 1968 to 1984
- Manning Marable, professor and author
- Jill Nelson, author and journalist
- Stanley Nelson, documentary filmmaker. His documentary, A Place Of Our Own, aired on the PBS series Independent Lens
- Peter Norton, founder of Peter Norton Computing which developed the Norton Utilities.
- Charles Ogletree, professor and lawyer
- Adam Clayton Powell Jr., congressman, and his former wife Isabel Powell, sister of actress Fredi Washington
- Paul Robeson, actor
- Adele Y. Schonbrun, artist
- Carole Simpson, former ABC News anchor
- Louis Wade Sullivan, former U.S. Secretary of Health and Human Services
- Ethel Waters, singer
- Dorothy West, author

== See also ==
- Vineyard Haven
- Sag Harbor Hills, Azurest, and Ninevah Beach Subdivisions Historic District
