= Gladding-Hearn Shipbuilding =

Gladding-Hearn Shipbuilding is a shipyard located in Somerset, Massachusetts on the Taunton River. It primarily builds pilot boats and high-speed catamaran ferries.

Gladding-Hearn was founded in 1954 by Preston Gladding and Richard Hearn, and delivered its first vessel, a fishing boat, in 1956. The company built largely tugboats, pilot boats, and fishing vessels for the next several decades. In 1977, Gladding-Hearn was the first American shipyard to launch a tug equipped with a Z-drive propulsion system, and in 1978 built the first pilot boat to a deep-V hull design by naval architect C. Raymond Hunt that became the industry standard in following years. In 1983, company vice president George Duclos bought out Gladding and Hearn and established the shipyard as a subsidiary of his family company, the Duclos Corporation. In 1984, Gladding-Hearn became a licensee of designer Incat (now Incat Crowther), giving it access to designs for high speed catamaran vessels. It has since built the majority of such vessels in service on the Eastern seaboard and Great Lakes. As of 2026, Gladding-Hearn had built more than 446 ships, with 120 in active service for 38 operators.
