= Soviet offensive plans controversy =

Late-20th-century debate on whether Stalin planned to invade Germany in 1941

Division of Europe in May 1941

The Soviet offensive plans controversy was a debate among historians as to whether Joseph Stalin had planned to launch an attack against Nazi Germany in the summer of 1941. The controversy began with the 1988 book Icebreaker: Who started the Second World War? by former Soviet defector and UK resident Viktor Suvorov. In it, he claimed that Stalin used Nazi Germany as a proxy to attack Europe.

Suvorov's main argument, that the Soviet government was planning to launch an offensive campaign against Nazi Germany, has been widely criticized as a historical distortion. The majority of historians believe Stalin sought to avoid war in 1941 because he believed his military was not prepared to fight German forces, though historians disagree on why Stalin persisted with his appeasement strategy of Nazi Germany despite mounting evidence of an impending German invasion.

== Policies of Stalin 1930-1941 ==
The Soviets faced a threat in the east from the expansionist Japanese in the latter part of the 1930s. The Soviet–Japanese border conflicts culminated in the Battles of Khalkhin Gol in 1939. Stalin initiated a military build-up, with the Red Army more than doubling between January 1939 and June 1941. In haste many of its officers were poorly trained. Between 1940 and 1942 Stalin purged the military, leaving it with a severe shortage of trained officers.

In August 1939, the Soviet Union (Stalin) and Nazi Germany (Hitler) signed the Molotov–Ribbentrop Pact with a secret protocol dividing Eastern Europe. On 1 September, Germany started the Invasion of Poland, leading the UK and France to declare war only on Germany. On 17 September the Red Army invaded eastern Poland. On 30 November 1939, the Soviets started invading Finland, starting the Winter War. Despite numerical inferiority, the Finns kept the Red Army at bay. Embarrassed by their inability to defeat the Finns, Stalin signed an interim peace treaty (12 March 1940). In June 1940, while the German Wehrmacht defeated France (Battle of France), the Red Army occupied the Baltic states, which were forcibly merged into the Soviet Union in August. They also invaded and annexed Bessarabia and northern Bukovina, parts of Romania. The speed of the German victory over and occupation of France in mid-1940 took Stalin by surprise. He seemingly focused on appeasement in order to delay conflict. In spring of 1941, Stalin concluded that relations with Germany had deteriorated to such an extent that he needed to become de jure head of government as well, and on 6 May, replaced Molotov as Premier of the Soviet Union.

The Stalin Line fortifications along the western border of the Soviet Union were dismantled in favour of constructing the Molotov Line further west, along the new border of the USSR (Curzon Line). The Axis invasion starting on 22 June 1941 caught the Red Army with the new line unfinished and the Stalin Line largely abandoned and in disrepair, neither was of much use.

== Debate ==
Historians have debated whether Stalin was planning an invasion of German territory in the summer of 1941. The debate began in the late 1980s when Viktor Suvorov published a journal article and later the book Icebreaker in which he claimed that Stalin had seen the outbreak of war in Western Europe as an opportunity to spread communist revolutions throughout the continent, and that the Soviet military was being deployed for an imminent attack at the time of the German invasion. This view had also been advanced by former German generals following the war. Suvorov's thesis was fully or partially accepted by a limited number of historians, including Valeri Danilov, Joachim Hoffmann, Mikhail Meltyukhov, and Vladimir Nevezhin and attracted public attention in Germany, Israel, and Russia. It has been strongly rejected by most historians and Icebreaker is generally considered to be an "anti-Soviet tract" in Western countries. David Glantz and Gabriel Gorodetsky wrote books to rebut Suvorov's arguments. The majority of historians believe that Stalin was seeking to avoid war in 1941, as he believed that his military was not ready to fight the German forces.

According to Professor Alexander Hill, it is currently (2012) believed that whereas the war against "capitalist powers" was seen as potentially inevitable by Soviet leadership, the Soviet Union was making some preparations for war, and the Soviet pursuit for a collective security system in Europe ("Litvinov's line") was sincere in the late 1930s, the event that triggered active Soviet war preparations was the rapid collapse of the Anglo-French alliance in June 1940. British historian Evan Mawdsley wrote in his book "Thunder in the East: The Nazi-Soviet War, 1941–1945":

"Stalin and the Soviet high command were aware of the scale of the German build-up, but they believed they had matched it and that the Red Army could deal with an invasion, if it came to that. ... Stalin knew that large German forces had been deployed along the Soviet frontier. What he did not know was what Hitler intended to do with them, and he made a fatal misjudgement: he assumed that there was no plan to attack Russia in the near future. ... Stalin’s key assumption was perhaps that German policy was undecided, but that rash Soviet action could bring about an unnecessary, or at least premature, war with the Reich."

== Suvorov, Icebreaker ==
Vladimir Rezun, a former officer of the Soviet military intelligence who had defected to the UK, writing under the pseudonym Viktor Suvorov, justified the claim in his 1988 book Icebreaker: Who Started the Second World War and again in several subsequent books: M Day, The Last Republic, Cleansing, Suicide, The Shadow of Victory, I Take my words Back, The Last Republic II, The Chief Culprit, and Defeat. He argued that Soviet ground forces were well-organized and mobilized en masse along the German–Soviet frontier for a Soviet invasion of Europe slated for Sunday, 6 July 1941 but were unprepared to defend their own territory.

One of Suvorov's pieces of evidence favoring the theory of an impending Soviet attack was his claim regarding the maps and phrasebooks issued to Soviet troops. Military topographic maps, unlike other military supplies, are strictly local and cannot be used elsewhere than in the intended operational area. Suvorov claims Soviet units were issued with maps of Germany and German-occupied territory, and phrasebooks including questions about SA offices—SA offices were found only in German territory proper. In contrast, maps of Soviet territory were scarce. Notably, after the German attack, the officer responsible for maps, Lieutenant General Mikhail Kudryavtsev, was not punished by Stalin, who was known for extreme punishments after failures to obey his orders. According to Suvorov, this demonstrates that Kudryavtsev was obeying the orders of Stalin, who simply did not expect a German attack.

Suvorov offers as another piece of evidence the extensive effort Stalin took to conceal general mobilization by manipulating the laws setting the conscription age. That allowed Stalin to provide the expansive build-up of the Red Army. Since there was no universal military draft in the Soviet Union until 1939, by enacting the universal military draft on 1 September 1939 (the date World War II had begun), and by changing the minimum age for joining the Red Army from 21 to 18, Stalin triggered a mechanism which achieved a dramatic increase in the military strength of the Red Army.

This specific law on mobilization allowed the Red Army to increase its army of 1,871,600 men in 1939 to 5,081,000 in the spring of 1941 under secrecy to avoid alarming the rest of the world.

Suvorov's main points include the following:

- The Soviet Union was intrinsically unstable. It had to expand to survive. According to Suvorov's interpretation of the permanent revolution theory, the communist system had to expand and occupy the entire world to survive. Otherwise, the system would fail in a peaceful and/or military struggle with surrounding "capitalist" countries. Stalin and other Soviet leaders opposed this and high-ranking officials who supported "permanent revolution" were purged from the Communist Party of the Soviet Union. Stalin publicly declared that "the ultimate victory of socialism... can only be achieved on an international scale".
- Stalin escalated tensions in Europe by providing a combination of economic and military support to Weimar Germany, and later to Nazi Germany (see Germany–Soviet Union relations before 1941). After World War I, the Entente attempted to impose severe restrictions on Weimar Germany to prevent it from rearming and again becoming a significant military competitor. During "the early 1920s until 1933, the Soviet Union was engaged in secret collaboration with the German military to enable it to circumvent the provisions of the Versailles Treaty", which limited Germany's military production. Moscow allowed the Germans to produce and test their weapons on Soviet territory, while some Red Army officers attended general-staff courses in Germany. The basis for this collaboration was the Treaty of Rapallo, signed between the two nations in 1922, and subsequent diplomatic interactions. This collaboration ended when the anti-communist Nazis took power in 1933. But, according to Suvorov, in the years 1932–1933, "Stalin helped Hitler come to power by forbidding German Communists to make common cause with the Social Democrats against the Nazis in parliamentary elections". Suvorov claims that Stalin's plan and vision was that Hitler's predictability and his violent reactionary ideas made him a candidate for the role of "icebreaker" for the Communist revolution. By starting wars with European countries, Hitler would validate the USSR's entry into World War II by attacking Nazi Germany and "liberating" and Sovietising all of Europe. When concluding the Molotov–Ribbentrop Pact in 1939, Stalin "clearly counted on the repetition of the 1914–1918 war of attrition, which would leave the "capitalist" countries so exhausted that the USSR could sweep into Europe virtually unopposed" (see also Stalin's speech of 19 August 1939).
- According to Suvorov, Stalin always planned to exploit military conflict between the capitalist countries to his advantage. He said as early as 1925 that "That may seem strange, comrades, but it is a fact. Had the two chief coalitions of capitalist countries not been engaged in mortal combat during the imperialist war in 1917, had they not been clutching at each other's throats, had they not been busy with their own affairs and unable to spare time to wage a struggle against the Soviet power, it is doubtful whether the Soviet power would have survived. The struggle, conflicts and wars between our enemies, I repeat, constitute an extremely important ally for us." and "If a war does break out, we will not sit with folded arms – we will have to take the field, but we will be last to do so. And we shall do so in order to throw the decisive load on the scale".
- World War II was initiated by Nazi Germany and the USSR, which became co-belligerents after signing the Molotov–Ribbentrop Pact. The essence of this pact was in the secret protocols which divided Europe into spheres of influence, and removed the Polish buffer between Germany and the USSR. Some countries that fell into the Soviet sphere of influence – Estonia, Latvia and Lithuania – were occupied. The difference between these smaller nations, occupied and annexed by the USSR, and Poland (which was initially attacked by Germany) was that Poland had military assistance guarantees from Great Britain and France.
- According to Suvorov, Stalin planned to attack Nazi Germany from the rear in July 1941, only a few weeks after the date on which the Axis invasion of the Soviet Union took place. Therefore, the Red Army had already redeployed from a defensive to an offensive stance. Suvorov also states that Stalin had made no major defensive preparations.
- According to Suvorov, Hitler's intelligence identified the USSR's preparations to attack Germany. Therefore, the Wehrmacht had drafted a preemptive war plan based on Hitler's orders as early as mid-1940, soon after the Soviet annexations of Bessarabia and Northern Bukovina. On 22 June 1941, the Axis began an assault on the USSR.

== Criticism and support of books by Suvorov ==
In some countries, particularly in Russia, Germany, and Israel, Suvorov's thesis has jumped the bonds of academic discourse and captured the imagination of the public. According to an article in The Inquiries Journal by Christopher J. Kshyk, the debate on whether Stalin intended to launch offensive against Germany in 1941 remains inconclusive but has produced an abundance of scholarly literature and helped to expand the understanding of larger themes in Soviet and world history during the interwar period. Kshyk also notes the problems because of the still-limited access to Soviet archives and the emotional nature of debate from national pride and the participants' political and personal motivations. Kshyk believe to be erroneous the notion that Stalin was preparing to launch an offensive against Germany in the summer of 1941.

However, studies by some historians, such as the Russian military historian Mikhail Meltyukhov (Stalin's Missed Chance), gave partial support to the claim that Soviet forces were concentrating to attack Germany. Other historians who support that thesis are Vladimir Nevezhin, Boris Sokolov, Valeri Danilov and Joachim Hoffmann († 2002). Offensive interpretations of Stalin's prewar planning are also supported by the Sovietologist Robert C. Tucker and by Pavel N. Bobylev. Hoffmann argued that the actual Soviet troop concentrations, fuel depots and airfields were near the German-Soviet border in what was Poland. All of them are said to be unsuitable for defensive operations. Hoffmann further echoed Suvorov in asserting that the Red Army had abundant detailed maps of Germany, Lithuania, German-controlled Polish areas, and East Prussia, while they had a severe shortage of maps of their own territory.

American historian Sean McMeekin claims that while the Suvorov thesis was largely ignored in the West, based on the authority of notable critics like Glantz and Gorodetsky, it was nevertheless treated seriously in the Eastern European countries, which were directly involved in the German-Soviet struggle. The discussion resulted in dozens of serious studies at least partially supporting Suvorov's thesis, which were usually better documented than Suvorov's. Notable examples include collections of documents by L.E. Reshin and collaborators and studies of Meltyukhov and Mark Solonin. As of 2021 most of these have not been translated into English. According to McMeekin, the new studies show that the traditional view of a surprise German attack against the Soviet Union can no longer be held. Yet despite the vast increase of knowledge due to the recent research, there are still many unknown issues, especially the real intentions of Stalin on the eve of war, which were known only to Stalin himself.

Strength of the opposing forces on the Soviet Western border. 22 June 1941 (Note: Since the Soviet archives were and sometimes are inaccessible, exact figures in some cases have been difficult to ascertain. The official Soviet sources generally overestimated German strength and downplayed Soviet strength, as is emphasized by Glantz Some of the earlier Soviet figures claimed that there had been only 1,540 Soviet aircraft to face Germany's 4,950 and there were merely 1,800 Red Army AFVs facing Germany's 2,800. In 1991, the Russian military historian Meltyukhov published an article on that question with figures that differed slightly from those of the table here but with similar ratios. Glantz believes that those figures seem "to be most accurate regarding Soviet forces and those of Germany's allies", but other figures also occur in modern publications.)
	Germany	Soviet Union	Ratio
Divisions	128	174	1 : 1.4
Personnel	3,459	3,289	1.1 : 1
Guns and mortars	35,928	59,787	1 : 1.7
Tanks (incl assault guns)	3,769	15,687	1 : 4.2
Aircraft	3,425	10,743	1 : 3.1

Supporters of the theory also refer to various facts, such as the publication of Georgy Zhukov's proposal of 15 May 1941, which called for a Soviet strike against Germany, to support their position. That document suggested a secret mobilisation and deployment of Red Army troops next to the western border under the cover of training. However, Robin Edmonds argued that the Red Army's planning staff would not have been doing its job well if it had not considered the possibility of a preemptive strike against the Wehrmacht, and Teddy J. Uldricks pointed out that no documentary evidence shows that Zhukov's proposal was ever accepted by Stalin.

Another piece of evidence is Stalin's speech of 5 May 1941 to graduating military cadets. He proclaimed: "A good defence signifies the need to attack. Attack is the best form of defence.... We must now conduct a peaceful, defensive policy with attack. Yes, defence with attack. We must now re-teach our army and commanders. Educate them in the spirit of attack." However, according to Michael Jabara Carley, that speech could be equally interpreted as a deliberate attempt to discourage the Germans from launching an invasion.

Colonel Dr. Pavel N. Bobylev was one of the military historians from the Soviet (later Russian) Ministry of Defense who in 1993 published the materials of the January 1941 games on maps. More than 60 top Soviet officers for about ten days in January rehearsed the possible scenarios to begin a war against the Axis. The materials show that no battles were played out on the Soviet soil. The action started only when the Soviets ("Easterners") attacked westward from their border and, in the second game ("South Variant"), even from positions deep inside the enemy's land.

Other Russian historians, Iu. Gor'kov, A.S. Orlov, Iu. A. Polyakov, and Dmitri Volkogonov, analyzed newly available evidence to demonstrate that Soviet forces were certainly not ready for the attack. British historian Evan Mawdsley asserted that although Stalin was aware about large-scale German deployments across the Soviet borders, he made a fatal miscalculation due to his ignorance of Hitler's real motives in 1941. Stalin thought that the German leadership was undecided and sought to avoid making moves that could potentially escalate into a war with Nazi Germany. Although they received several intelligence reports of a forthcoming German invasion, Soviet leaders assumed that Hitler wanted to avoid a two-front war. Stalin said to Georgy Zhukov in mid-June 1941:

"Germany has a Treaty of Non-Aggression with us. Germany is involved up to its ears in the war in the West, and I believe that Hitler will not risk creating a second front for himself by attacking the Soviet Union. Hitler is not such a fool as to think that the Soviet Union is Poland, that it is France, that it is England, and even that it is [just] all of them put together."

=== Criticism ===
Among the noted critics of Suvorov's work are the Israeli historian Gabriel Gorodetsky; the American military historian David Glantz; and the Russian military historians Makhmut Gareev, Lev Bezymensky, Dmitri Volkogonov, and Alexei Isayev. Many other western scholars, such as Teddy J. Uldricks, Derek Watson, Hugh Ragsdale, Roger Reese, Stephen Blank, Robin Edmonds, and Ingmar Oldberg agree that the Suvorov's major weakness is "that the author does not reveal his sources" and relies on circumstantial evidence. The historian Cynthia A. Roberts is even more categorical and claims that Suvorov's writings have "virtually no evidentiary base".

Suvorov's most controversial thesis was that the Red Army had made extensive preparations for an offensive war in Europe but was totally unprepared for defensive operations on its own territory.

One of Suvorov's arguments was that certain types of weapons were mostly suited for offensive warfare and that the Red Army had large numbers of such weapons. For example, he pointed out that the Soviet Union was outfitting large numbers of paratroopers and actually prepared to field entire parachute armies, and he stated that paratroopers are suitable only for offensive action, which the Soviet military doctrine of the time recognised. Suvorov's critics say that the Soviet paratroopers were not well trained or armed. Similarly, Suvorov cited the development of the KT/Antonov A-40 "flying tank" as evidence of Stalin's aggressive plans, but his critics say that development of that tank was started only in December 1941.

David M. Glantz disputes the argument that the Red Army was deployed in an offensive stance in 1941 and states that the Red Army was in a state of only partial mobilization in July 1941 from which neither effective defensive or offensive actions could be offered without considerable delay.

Paweł Wieczorkiewicz, the author of a detailed description of the purge in the Red Army (Łańcuch śmierci: czystka w Armii Czerwonej 1937–1939, 1335 pages), believed that the Red Army had not been prepared to fight in 1941 because of the recent purges of the Red Army and its modernisation projects.

A Soviet émigré, the historian Alexandr Nekrich, while extremely critical of Stalin in other contexts, also rejected Suvorov's ideas as unsubstantiated and contrary to Stalin's broader policy.

In 1997, D. Brandenberger wrote that the recently published German Intelligence analysis of Soviet military readiness before 1941 had concluded that Soviet preparations to be "defensive". Evan Mawdsley criticized Suvorov's claims and dismissed his characterization of Operation Barbarossa as a pre-emptive military assault. Mawdsley asserted that the German invasion of Russia was part of the Nazi leadership's overall strategy to advance their expansionist and colonialist agendas. According to Mawdsley: "Germany did not invade Russia because its leaders knew about, or feared, an imminent Soviet onslaught. Goebbels summed up the perception of the top Nazi leaders in a diary entry of early May 1941: ‘Stalin and his people remain completely inactive. Like a rabbit confronted by a snake.’"

=== Middle positions ===
In a 1987 article in the Historische Zeitschrift journal, the German historian Klaus Hildebrand argued that both Hitler and Stalin had separately planned to attack each other in 1941. He considered that the news of Red Army concentrations near the border had led to Hitler engaging in a Flucht nach vorn ("flight forward"), a response to a danger by charging on, rather than retreating: "Independently, the National Socialist program of conquest met the equally far-reaching war-aims program which Stalin had drawn up in 1940 at the latest".

Antony Beevor wrote that "the Red Army was simply not in a state to launch a major offensive in the summer of 1941, and in any case Hitler's decision to invade had been made considerably earlier." However, he also noted that "it cannot be excluded that Stalin... may have been considering a preventive attack in the winter of 1941 or more probably in 1942...".

=== Support ===
The work by Suvorov gathered some support among Russian historians, starting in the 1990s. Support in Russia for Suvorov's claim that Stalin had been preparing a strike against Hitler in 1941 began to emerge as some archive materials were declassified. Authors supporting the Stalin 1941 assault thesis are Valeri Danilov, V.A. Nevezhin, Constantine Pleshakov, Mark Solonin and Boris Sokolov. Although the USSR attacked Finland, no documents have been found to date which would indicate 26 November 1939 as the assumed date for the beginning of provocations or 30 November as the date of the planned Soviet assault.

One view was expressed by Mikhail Meltyukhov in his study Stalin's Missed Chance. The author states that the idea for striking Germany arose long before May 1941, and was the very basis of Soviet military planning from 1940 to 1941. Providing additional support for this thesis is that no significant defense plans have been found. In his argument, Meltyukhov covers five different versions of the assault plan, the first version of which was developed soon after the outbreak of World War II. The last version was to be completed by 1 May 1941. Even the deployment of troops was chosen in the South, which would have been more beneficial in case of a Soviet assault.

Edvard Radzinsky in his book Stalin: The First In-depth Biography Based on Explosive New Documents from Russia's Secret Archives drew on documents from the archives to support the finding that Soviet command had plans for a preemptive strike against Nazi Germany in 1941. Radzinsky cited a document preserved in the Military-Memorial Center of the Soviet General Staff, which was a draft of a plan for military strategy in case of war with Germany, drawn up by Georgy Zhukov, dated May 15, 1941, and signed by Aleksandr Vasilevsky and Nikolai Vatutin. The document stated:

"In view of the fact that Germany at present keeps its army fully mobilized with its rear services deployed, it has the capacity of deploying ahead of us and striking a sudden blow. To prevent this I consider it important not to leave the operational initiative to the German command in any circumstances, but to anticipate the enemy and attack the German army at the moment when it is in the process of deploying and before it has time to organize its front and the coordination of its various arms".

In Stalin's War of Extermination, Joachim Hoffmann made extensive use of interrogations of Soviet prisoners of war, ranging in rank from general to private, conducted by their German captors during the war. The book is also based on open-source, unclassified literature, and recently declassified materials. Based on this material, Hoffmann argues that the Soviet Union was making final preparations for its own attack when the Wehrmacht struck. Danilov and Heinz Magenheimer examined this plan and other documents in the early 1990s, which might indicate Soviet preparations for an attack. Both researchers came to the conclusion that Zhukov's plan of May 15, 1941 reflected Stalin's alleged speech of 19 August 1939 heralding the birth of the new offensive Red Army.

Mark Solonin notes that several variants of a war plan against Germany had existed at least since August 1940. He argues that in the Russian archives there are five versions of the general plan for the strategic deployment of the Red Army and ten documents reflecting the development of plans for operational deployment of western military districts. The differences between them were slight, all documents (including operational maps signed by the Deputy Chief of General Staff of the Red Army) are the plans for the invasion with depth offensive 300 km. Solonin also states that no other plans for Red Army deployment in 1941 have been found so far, and that the concentration of Red Army units in Western parts of USSR was done in direct accordance with the May "Considerations on plan for strategic deployment":

Planned and actual Red Army deployment on the Soviet Western Border (Note: On June 21, armies expanded in the Southern Theatre of Military Operations, and were divided into two Fronts: South-Western and Southern. The table contains the total number of divisions in the two Fronts and in the Crimea.)
	"Considerations", May 41	"Reference", June 13	Actual confinement as of June 22, 1941
Northern Front	Three armies (21 divisions) (4 tank divisions, 2 motorised divisions)	------ 22 divisions 4 tank, 2 mot.	three armies (Note: 14th, 7th, and 23rd Armies) (21 divisions); 4 tank, 2 mot.
North-Western Front	Three armies, (23 divisions); 4 tank, 2 mot.	23 divisions 4 tank, 2 mot.	three armies (Note: 27th, 8th, and 11th Armies) (25 divisions); 4 tank, 2 mot
Western Front	Four armies, 45 / 8 / 4	------ 44 / 12 / 6	3rd, 10th, 4th, 13th Armies, 44 / 12 / 6
South-Western Front and Southern Front	Eight armies,122 / 28 / 15	------ 100 / 20 / 10	six armies (Note: 5th, 6th, 26th, 12th, 18th, and 9th Armies) (80 divisions); 20 tank, 10 mot.
Stavka reserve	five armies, 47 divisions 12 tank 8 mot	five armies, 51 divisions 11 tank 5 mot	seven armies (Note: 22nd, 20th, 21st, 19th, 16th, 24th, and 28th Armies) (77 divisions); 5 tank, 2 mot.

Notes: first figure– total number of divisions; second figure– tank divisions; third figure – motorized divisions

According to the Plan of Cover, after the commencement of combat actions, two divisions of the Northwest front, expanded in Estonia, were transferred to the Northern Front.

Several politicians have also made claims similar to Suvorov's. On 20 August 2004, the historian and former Estonian prime minister Mart Laar published an article in The Wall Street Journal, When Will Russia Say 'Sorry'?: "The new evidence shows that by encouraging Hitler to start World War II, Stalin hoped to simultaneously ignite a world-wide revolution and conquer all of Europe". Another former statesman to share those views of a purported Soviet aggressive plan is the former Finnish President Mauno Koivisto: "It seems to be clear the Soviet Union was not ready for defense in the summer of 1941, but it was rather preparing for an assault.... The forces mobilized in the Soviet Union were not positioned for defensive, but for offensive aims". He concluded, "Hitler's invasion forces didn't outnumber [the Soviets], but were rather outnumbered themselves. The Soviets were unable to organize defenses. The troops were provided with maps that covered territories outside the Soviet Union".

== See also ==
- Causes of World War II
- Germany–Soviet Union relations before 1941
- German–Soviet Axis talks
- Eastern Front (World War II)
- Soviet–Polish Non-Aggression Pact
- Stalin's speech of 19 August 1939
- Igor Bunich

== Bibliography ==
- Beevor, Antony (5 June 2012). The Second World War. New York: Little Brown & Company. ISBN 978-0-316-02374-0. OCLC 764372841.
- Bellamy, Chris (2007). Absolute war: Soviet Russia in World War Two. New York: Knopf. ISBN 978-0-375-41086-4. OCLC 154678367.
- Bergström, Christer (2007). Barbarossa: The air battle: July-December 1941. Hersham: Midland Publishing. ISBN 978-1-85780-270-2.
- Erickson, John. "Barbarossa June 1941: Who Attacked Whom?" History Today, July 2001, Vol. 51, Issue 7, pp. 11–17.
- Förster, Jürgen; Mawdsley, Evan (2004). "Hitler and Stalin in perspective: Secret speeches on the eve of Barbarossa". War in History. 11 (1): 61–103. doi:10.1191/0968344504wh293oa. ISSN 0968-3445.
- Farrell, Brian P. (1993). "Yes, prime minister: Barbarossa, Whipcord, and the basis of British grand strategy, autumn 1941". The Journal of Military History. 57 (4): 599–625. doi:10.2307/2944096. JSTOR 2944096.
- Glantz, David M. (1991). Soviet military operational art: In pursuit of deep battle. Cass series on Soviet military theory and practice. London: Frank Cass. ISBN 978-0-7146-4077-8.
- Glantz, David M. (2001). Barbarossa: Hitler's invasion of Russia, 1941. Battles & campaigns. Stroud, Gloucestershire: Tempus Publishing. ISBN 978-0-7524-1979-4.
- Glantz, David M. (1998). Stumbling colossus: The Red Army on the eve of world war. Modern war studies. Lawrence, Kansas: University Press of Kansas. ISBN 978-0-7006-0879-9.
- Glantz, David M. (2005). Colossus reborn: The Red Army at war, 1941–1943. Modern war studies. University Press of Kansas. ISBN 978-0-7006-1353-3.
- Gorodetsky, Gabriel (1999). Grand delusion: Stalin and the German invasion of Russia. New Haven, CT: Yale University Press. ISBN 978-0-300-08459-7.
- Hoffmann, Joachim (1995). Stalins Vernichtungskrieg 1941–1945 [Stalin's war of extermination, 1941-194] (in German). Munich: Verlag für Wehrwissenschaften. ISBN 978-3-8219-0031-5. Revised and republished as Hoffmann, Joachim (1999). Stalins Vernichtungskrieg 1941–1945: Planung, Ausführung und Dokumentation [Stalin's war of extermination, 1941–1945: Planning, realization, and documentation] (in German). Munich: Herbig. ISBN 978-3-7766-2079-5.
- Humpert, David M. Viktor Suvorov and Operation Barbarossa: Tukhachevskii Revisited The Journal of Slavic Military Studies, Volume 18, 2005 - Issue 1.
- Kershaw, Robert J. (2000). War without garlands: Operation Barbarossa, 1941/42. Shepperton, UK: Ian Allan. ISBN 978-0-7110-2734-3.
- Krivosheev, G. F., ed. (1997). Soviet casualties and combat losses in the twentieth century. London: Greenhill Books. ISBN 978-1-85367-280-4. Republished as Россия и СССР в войнах XX века: Потери вооруженных сил: Статистическое исследование [Russia and the USSR in the wars of the 20th century: Losses of the armed forces: Statistical study] (in Russian). Moscow: Olma Press. 2001. Archived from the original on 17 October 2004.
- Koch, Hannsjoachim Wolfgang (1983). "Hitler's 'programme' and the genesis of Operation 'Barbarossa'". The Historical Journal. 26 (4): 891–920. doi:10.1017/S0018246X00012747. ISSN 0018-246X. JSTOR 2639289. Republished as "Hitler's 'programme' and the genesis of Operation 'Barbarossa'". Aspects of the Third Reich. London: Macmillan Education UK. 1985. pp. 285–322. doi:10.1007/978-1-349-17891-9_10. ISBN 978-0-333-35273-1.
- Latimer, Jon (2001). Deception in war. London: John Murray. ISBN 978-0-7195-5605-0.
- Maser, Werner (1994). Der Wortbruch: Hitler, Stalin und der Zweite Weltkrieg [The broken word: Hitler, Stalin and the Second World War]. München: Olzog. ISBN 3-7892-8260-X.
- Megargee, Geoffrey P. (2006). War of annihilation: Combat and genocide on the eastern front, 1941. Lanham, MA: Rowman & Littlefield. ISBN 978-0-7425-4481-9.
- Mineau, André (2004). Operation Barbarossa: Ideology and ethics against human dignity. Amsterdam: Rodopi. ISBN 978-90-420-1633-0.
- Murphy, David E. (2005). What Stalin knew: The enigma of Barbarossa. New Haven: Yale University Press. ISBN 978-0-300-10780-7.
  - Conquest, Robert (April 2006). "Murphy. What Stalin knew". The American Historical Review (Book review). 111 (2): 591–592. doi:10.1086/ahr.111.2.591. ISSN 0002-8762.
- Nekrich, Aleksandr Moiseevich; Petrov, Vladimir (1968). "June 22, 1941": Soviet Historians and the German Invasion. Columbia, South Carolina: University of South Carolina Press. ISBN 978-0-87249-134-2.
- Pleshakov, Konstantin (2005). Stalin's folly: The tragic first ten days of World War II on the eastern front. Boston: Houghton Mifflin. ISBN 978-0-618-36701-6.
- Rayfield, Donald (2004). Stalin and his hangmen: An authoritative portrait of a tyrant and those who served him. London: Viking. ISBN 978-0-670-91088-5.
- Roberts, Cynthia A. (December 1995). "Planning for war: The red army and the catastrophe of 1941" (PDF). Europe-Asia Studies. 47 (8): 1293–1326. doi:10.1080/09668139508412322. ISSN 0966-8136. JSTOR 153299.
- Roberts, Geoffrey (2006). Stalin's Wars: From World War to Cold War, 1939-1953. Yale University Press. ISBN 978-0300112047.
- Rees, Laurence (1999). War of the century: When Hitler fought Stalin. London: BBC Books. ISBN 978-0-563-38477-9. OCLC 42038620. Republished as War of the century: When Hitler fought Stalin. New York City: New Press. 1999. ISBN 1-56584-599-4. OCLC 43690103.
- *Shirer, William L. (1960). The Rise and Fall of the Third Reich. New York: Simon & Schuster. LCCN 60-6729.. Republished as The rise and fall of the Third Reich: A history of Nazi Germany. Simon & Schuster. 1990. ISBN 978-0-671-72868-7.
- "Kriegsausbruch 1941: Von Stalin provoziert?" [Outbreak of war in 1941: Provoked by Stalin?]. der Spiegel (in German). Vol. 1962, no. 31. 31 July 1962.
- Suvorov, Viktor (20 July 2007). The chief culprit: Stalin's grand design to start World War II. Dulles, Virginia: Potomac Books. ISBN 978-1-59797-114-0. OCLC 148715018. Republished as Suvorov, Viktor (2008). The chief culprit: Stalin's grand design to start World War II. Annapolis, Maryland: Naval Institute Press. ISBN 978-1-59114-838-8."Review of The Chief Culprit: Stalin's Grand Design to Start World War II by Michael Jabara Carley". "Review of The Chief Culprit: Stalin's Grand Design to Start World War II by Patrick D. Devenny".
- Taylor, Alan John Percivale; Mayer, S. L., eds. (1974). History of World War II. London: Octopus Books. ISBN 0-7064-0399-1.
- Uldricks, Teddy J. (1999). "The Icebreaker controversy: Did Stalin plan to attack Hitler?". Slavic Review. 58 (3): 626–643. doi:10.2307/2697571. ISSN 0037-6779. JSTOR 2697571.
- Waller, John H. (1996). The unseen war in Europe: Espionage and conspiracy in the Second World War. London: I. B. Tauris. ISBN 978-1-86064-092-6.
- Weeks, Albert L. (2003). Stalin's other war: Soviet grand strategy, 1939–1941. Lanham, Maryland: Rowman & Littlefield. ISBN 0-7425-2192-3.
- Wegner, Bernd, ed. (1997). From peace to war: Germany, Soviet Russia, and the world, 1939–1941. Providence, Rhode Island: Berghahn Books. ISBN 978-1-57181-882-9.
  - Konecny, Peter (August 1999). "From peace to war by Wegner". Canadian Journal of History (Book review). 34 (2): 288–290. doi:10.3138/cjh.34.2.288. ISSN 0008-4107.
- Wieczynski, Joseph L. (1993). Operation Barbarossa: The German attack on the Soviet Union, June 22, 1941. Salt Lake City: Charles Schlacks Jr. ISBN 978-1-884445-01-9.
  - Fox, John P. (1996). "Operation Barbarossa by Wieczynski". The Slavonic and East European Review (Book review). 74 (2): 344–346. JSTOR 4212105.
- Ziemke, Earl F.; Bauer, Magna E. (1987). Moscow to Stalingrad: Decision in the east. United States Army Center of Military History. ISBN 978-0-16-001942-5. OCLC 460863829. ISBN 978-0-16-080081-8.
