= Stalin's Missed Chance =

Book by Michail Ivanovitsj Meltjuchov

Stalin's Missed Chance (Упущенный шанс Сталина. Советский Союз и борьба за Европу: 1939-1941 Stalin's Missed Chance: The Soviet Union and the Struggle for Europe: 1939-1941) is a study by the Russian military historian Mikhail Ivanovich Meltyukhov, the author of several books and articles on Soviet military history.

Stalin's Missed Chance covers a theory of a planned Soviet invasion raised by Viktor Suvorov, the author of highly controversial books such as Icebreaker. Unlike Suvorov's works, Meltyukhov's book is based on archive materials, some of which were until recently classified. Contrary to many Western scholars (David Glantz, John D. Erickson, Richard Overy, and others), Meltyukhov concurs with Suvorov's claim that Stalin and the Soviet military leadership had planned an offensive against Nazi Germany in 1941.

Meltyukhov rejects, however, Suvorov's claims that the German assault (Operation Barbarossa) was a pre-emptive strike. Meltyukhov affirms both sides had been preparing to invade the other but that neither believed the possibility of the other striking first.

Stalin's Missed Chance is an extensive study of archive sources and often quotes and summarizes wartime records of the Red Army and of the Soviet Union. The book also draws on a legion of published primary sources from 1939 to 1941.

== On the eve of World War II ==
According to Mikhail Meltyukhov, Russia had lost its position as a Great Power during the Great War, the Russian Revolution, and the subsequent breakup of the Russian Empire. The Soviet leadership had the choices either to accept the regional status of the Soviet Union or to become a great power once again. Having decided for the latter, the Soviet leadership used Communist ideology (the Comintern, the idea of world revolution etc.) to strengthen its position. The key objective was to exclude a possible alliance of Capitalist countries. Although diplomatic relationships had been established with the capitalist countries, he does not believe that the Soviet Union was accepted as an equal partner.

That changed, however, in the course of the political crisis of 1939, when two military and political blocs formed: Anglo-French and German-Italian, both of which were interested in an agreement with the Soviets. Moscow had the opportunity to choose with either and under what conditions to negotiate.

Its basic goal was to retain neutrality and, after both belligerent sides were weakened, to emerge as the decisive factor in ensuring victory for one side. Thus, "the USSR succeeded in staying out of the European war, after obtaining in this case a significant free hand in Eastern Europe, wider space to maneuver in its own interests between the belligerent sides."

During the years 1939 and 1940, the Soviets annexed several Eastern European countries and territories. The Kremlin believed that Germany was a force capable of weakening the British position and shaking the capitalist order. And "then at the suitable moment the Red Army could have destroyed Germany and would have freed Europe both from fascism and from 'rotten capitalism.'"

As for the Soviet-German relationship during 1940, Meltyukhov points out that although both sides had the common goal of weakening Britain and negotiations were held in November 1940, a military alliance was never realised. The Soviets would have had to leave the whole European continent to the German-Italian sphere of influence, which would relegate the Soviets to a second-rate role in the world matters.

== New phase ==
From that time onward, Germany was the main obstacle for Soviet penetration into Europe, and the relationship between the two nations entered a new phase. Both sides began preparing for the conflict.

The Soviets took steps to normalize relations with the Western governments (including French leaders). These negotiations intensified as rumours spread about a possible Soviet-German military conflict. In June 1941, the Soviets proposed negotiations with Germany, which could have deceived the Germans and provided justification for an assault if the talks broke down.

From early 1941, measures were taken for increased combat readiness in the Western boundary districts, a large part of which was to be completed by July 1. The Soviet economy approached war footing, and the country had prepared for troop mobilization since 1939.

According to Meltyukhov, the material resources and system of mobilization ensured the development of the army. He claims the Red Army considerably exceeded the German army in the quantity of armaments and combat materials (Meltyukhov 2000:497).

== Soviet and German offensive plans ==
As Meltyukhov asserts with his study, the General Staff of the Red Army had already begun developing a plan for an assault on Germany in October 1939. The process intensified in March 1940, and at least four different versions of the plan were developed throughout 1940 and 1941. The concentration of troops was disguised as maneuvers; in May/June 1941 the preparation for a Soviet invasion of Germany reached the final stage, as the full-scale concentration of troops began.

The draft plan from March 11, 1941 demanded to "start the offensive [on] 12.6.", which in Meltyukhov's opinion should refute the affirmation of Gorodetsky that the draft assumed defensive strategy. As it is known, the precise date of the outbreak of war is determined by the side which plans to strike first. Thus, Meltyyukhov thinks that the idea that the Red Army must strike first (clearly formulated in Zhukov's plan from May 15, 1941) was in a concealed form already present in all the previous drafts.

As for the usual suggestions that the Red Army was preparing a counteroffensive, a possible Wehrmacht invasion is suggested in plans cited by Meltyukhov, but with obvious lack of depth since the estimation of the enemy's intentions, with exception of the possible direction of the main attack, did not undergo substantial changes. Furthermore, Meltyukhov claims those plans did not proceed from factual data and that two possible Wehrmacht assault directions (the southern version, through Ukraine, and the northern version, through Lithuania and Latvia, which was abandoned later) were taken into consideration, and an assault on Belarus was excluded without any reason. Thus, one might wonder if that was merely guesswork. Aleksandr Vasilevsky has recalled himself that there was no straight answer to the probability of a German invasion and that no possible timing discussed. That fact and the absence of a connection between a possible strike by the enemy and the actions of the Red Army make the suggestion of a 'counter-strike strategy' very implausible to Meltyukhov.

On the other hand, the concentration of Red Army on the borders was elaborated throughout different plans (Meltyukhov reports five different versions) and went through substantial changes. As also indicated by M. A. Gareyev, who is himself skeptical of the Soviet strike thesis, "the direction of the concentration of basic efforts by Soviet command was chosen not in the interests of the strategic defensive operation (this operation was simply not provided and was not planned), and conformably entirely to other methods of operations."

Military actions would have begun with the surprise blow by the Soviet Air Force on the airfields of Eastern Prussia, Poland and Romania. The overall Soviet superiority in aviation would have made it possible to subject German airfields in a 250 km-deep border zone to continuous airstrikes, which would have led to a significant weakening of the enemy and would have facilitated Red Army ground forces operations. The ground forces were supposed to have two major strike directions: one striking towards Eastern Prussia and Poland and the other into Romania in the South.

The basic idea of Soviet military planning consisted in the fact that the Red Army was to concentrate near the border under the disguise of maneuvers and to go over into a sudden, decisive attack. "The absence of any references to the possible defensive operations of the Red Army shows that the discussion was not about the preparation for a pre-emptive strike but for the assault on Germany and its allies. This idea is clearly expressed in the document of May 15, 1941, by which the Red Army was to be guided in the beginning of war." Meltyukhov suggests that the assault on Germany was initially planned to take place on June 12, 1941 but that it was postponed because the Soviet leadership feared an Anglo-German reconciliation against the Soviet Union after the flight of Rudolf Hess on May 12, 1941.

The basis for that assumption is revealed by Molotov's recollection 40 years later in a conversation with Russian journalist Ivan Stadnyuk: "I don't remember all the motives for cancelling this decision, but it seems to me that Hitler's deputy Rudolf Hess' flight to England played the main role there. The NKVD reconnaissance reported to us, that Hess on behalf of Hitler had proposed the United Kingdom to conclude peace and to participate in the military march against the USSR... If we at this time would have unleashed ourselves a war against Germany, would have moved forces to Europe, then England could have entered the alliance with Germany without any delay... And not only England. We could have been face to face with the entire capitalist world".

Meltyukhov believes that "the question about the new period of the completion of war build-up was solved on May 24, 1941, at the secret conference of military-political leadership at the Kremlin. Now accessible sources show that the full concentration and the development of the Red Army on Soviet Western districts was to be completed by July 15, 1941. The rate of the concentration of the Red Army on the Western borders was increased. Together with the transfer of 77 divisions of the second strategic echelon, from June 12 to June 16, 1941, began another dislocation of troops of the second echelon of the armies and the reserves of the military districts near the western border.

As for the German offensive plans, Meltyukhov points out that the German leadership hoped for a rapid crushing defeat of the USSR which would have given Germany necessary resources for victory in a long war with England and maybe the United States. Hitler's idea could thus be characterised as striving for a victory in the East for the purpose of winning the war against the West.

Therefore, Meltyukhov claims, the explanations by Nazi leaders of a pre-emptive strike against the Soviet Union were groundless, since Hitler had regarded the concentration of Soviet troops as merely defensive. Operation Barbarossa was scheduled a long time before, and Hitler hadn't really comprehended the Soviet invasion threat. The concentration of Soviet troops was interpreted as a defensive reaction to the discovered Wehrmacht deployment. With regards to the failure of the Soviet leadership to comprehend the German threat, Stalin had not believed Hitler was going to invade and risk war on two fronts.

Besides, it is believed that Stalin was expecting a German ultimatum, which made the Soviets evaluate the concentration of troops as pressure tactic.

== Had the Soviet assault taken place ==
Meltyukhov asks the hypothetical question of what would have happened if the Soviets had carried out their initial plan and begun the invasion on June 12, 1941. By that time, German troops had completed preparations for Operation Barbarossa and concentrated themselves on the Soviet boundaries, where in the strip from the Baltic Sea to the Black Sea, Germany had already gathered 81.6% out of the divisions that the army would have on June 21. The remaining troops were in motion, and the Luftwaffe had completed re-dislocation after the Balkan campaign, but the "Wehrmacht had neither defensive nor offensive groups [yet], and a Soviet attack at this moment would have placed it in a very complicated position and made it possible [for the Red Army] to tear its forces apart."

The situation at the border strip from Ostrołęka to the Carpathians is shown in the table

	Red Army	German Army (including allies)	Relation
Divisions	128	55	2.3 : 1
Personnel	3,400,000	1,400,000	2.1 : 1
Artillery	38,500	16,300	2.4 : 1
Tanks	7,500	900	8.7 : 1
Aircraft	6,200	1,400	4.4 : 1

It is important to point out, however, that the table ignores powerful German forces positioned north of Ostroleka, which could have interfered with the Soviet plan. They included the whole of Army Group North with the Sixteenth Army, the Eighteenth Army, and Fourth Panzer Army, as well as Army Group Centre's Ninth Army and the Third Panzer Army to the North of Lomzha.

According to estimations by B. Sokolov, on the basis of Georgy Zhukov's proposal from May 15, 1941, 152 Soviet divisions had to break 100 German divisions as the main attack was provided for the South-Western Front in the direction of Kraków, Katowice.

Meltyukhov believes that the western leaders would have approved the Soviet strike, as it would have been difficult for the British to win the war alone and the British had already done everything within their means to convince the Soviets to take a less benevolent attitude towards Germany.

In a telegram to US President Franklin D. Roosevelt from June 15, 1941, British Prime Minister Winston Churchill suggested providing the Soviets with every possible assistance if a war started between Germany and the Soviet Union. Roosevelt accepted that proposal without reserve on June 21. (Meltyukhov 2000:507-8)

Taking everything into account, Meltyukhov claims that though an "offensive by the Red Army would not have led to the immediate solution on the outcome of war, […] the Red Army could have been in Berlin no later than in 1942, which would have made it possible to gain much greater territory in Europe under the control of Moscow, than it really did in 1945" (Meltyukhov 2000:506).

== Reception in the West ==
Meltyukhov's study, namely the chapter dealing with the Soviet military's takeover of the Baltic states, has been used by Estonian historian Magnus Ilmjärv in his book Silent Submission (2004) for specifics on Soviet military planning against the three republics and determining the number of Soviet forces that were allocated. Meltyukhov's book (which has been translated into Estonian as Stalini käestlastud võimalus) has also been reviewed quite positively by Estonian historians.

Similarly, the Russian émigré historian Constantine Pleshakov, who is supports the theory of the Soviet planned offensive, has drawn from Stalin's Missed Chance (as from books by V. Nevezhin and V. Danilov) in his recent study.

Meltyukhov's book was reviewed with others on related topics by Professor R.C. Raack in The Russian Review.

== See also ==
- Molotov–Ribbentrop Pact
- Operation Barbarossa
- Soviet offensive plans controversy
- Stalin's speech on August 19, 1939

== Reviews ==
- Генрих ЛЯТИЕВ. Два агрессора. [о кн. Михаила Мельтюхова "Упущенный шанс Сталина"]. «Октябрь» 2001, №11
- Дмитрий Хмельницкий. Правда Виктора Суворова. "Заметки по еврейской истории", Июнь 2006 года, №6 (67)
- Короленков А.В. Накануне: продолжение дискуссий о событиях предвоенной поры. - Отечественная история, 2004, № 3, с. 169-176
