= Icebreaker (non-fiction book) =

1989 history book by Viktor Suvorov

Icebreaker: Who started the Second World War?
- 1990 English language edition
- Author: Viktor Suvorov
- Original title: Russian: Ледокол : Кто начал Вторую мировую войну?
- Publication date: 1989
- English publication date: 1990
- ISBN: 978-0-241-12622-6
- OCLC: 21407864

Icebreaker: Who Started the Second World War? (Russian title: Ледокол) is a military history book by the Russian non-fiction author Viktor Suvorov, published in 1989. Suvorov argued that Joseph Stalin planned a conquest of Europe for many years, and was preparing to launch a surprise attack on Nazi Germany at the end of summer of 1941 to begin that plan. He says that Operation Barbarossa was a pre-emptive strike by Adolf Hitler, a claim which the Nazi leader himself had made at the time. Since the 1990s and the dissolution of the Soviet Union, this theory has received some support among historians in some post-Soviet and Central European states, but some Western scholars have criticized his conclusions for lack of evidence and documentation.

== Content ==
Suvorov first wrote about the theory in a short 1985 article. He expanded on it in his book Icebreaker and in subsequent books, ending with the 2007 monograph, The Chief Culprit: Stalin's Grand Design to Start World War II. He says that in 1930s, Stalin was planning a conquest of Europe, had been working toward this objective for many years, and directed his military to plan for it.

Suvorov argues that the Molotov–Ribbentrop Pact was engineered by Stalin to provoke Hitler to start a conflict with Western powers, which would have led to mutual exhaustion of "capitalist powers". Then, Stalin planned to seize an opportune moment to attack Germany from the east, overrun Europe, and establish Soviet control. Suvorov considers Operation Barbarossa to have been a pre-emptive strike by Hitler, an act of self-defence in an attempt to prevent imminent Red Army assault.

He argued that Soviet ground forces were well-organized and mobilized en masse along the German–Soviet frontier for a Soviet invasion of Europe slated for Sunday, July 6, 1941, but they were unprepared to defend their own territory.

He claimed that maps and phrasebooks issued to Soviet troops supported that theory. Military topographic maps, unlike other military supplies, are strictly local and cannot be used elsewhere than in the intended operational area. Suvorov claims that Soviet units were issued with maps of Germany and German-occupied territory and phrasebooks including questions about SA offices, which were found only in German territory proper. In contrast, maps of Soviet territory were scarce. Notably, after the German attack, the officer responsible for maps, Lieutenant General MK Kudryavtsev, was not punished by Stalin, who was known for extreme punishments after failures to obey his orders. According to Suvorov, that demonstrates that Kudryavtsev was obeying the orders of Stalin, who simply did not expect a German attack.

Suvorov offers as another piece of evidence the extensive effort Stalin took to conceal general mobilization by manipulating the laws setting the conscription age. That allowed Stalin to provide the expansive buildup of the Red Army. Since there was no universal military draft in the Soviet Union until 1939, by enacting the universal military draft on 1 September 1939 (the date that World War II had begun) and by changing the minimum age for joining the Red Army from 21 to 18, Stalin triggered a mechanism to achieve a dramatic increase in the military strength of the Red Army.

This specific law on mobilization allowed the Red Army to increase its army of 1,871,600 men in 1939 to 5,081,000 in the spring of 1941 under secrecy to avoid alarming the rest of the world. Also, 18,000,000 reservists were drafted for a duration of service of 2 years. Thus, according to supporters of that theory, the Red Army had to enter a war by 1 September 1941, or the drafted soldiers would have to be released from service.

=== Points ===
Suvorov's main points include the following:

- The Soviet Union was intrinsically unstable. It had to expand to survive. According to Suvorov's interpretation of the permanent revolution theory, the communist system had to expand and occupy the entire world to survive. Otherwise, the system would fail in a peaceful and/or military struggle with surrounding "capitalist" countries. Stalin and other Soviet leaders opposed that and high-ranking officials who supported "permanent revolution" were purged from the Communist Party of the Soviet Union. Stalin publicly declared that "the ultimate victory of socialism... can only be achieved on an international scale". Under that theory, Soviet leaders therefore started preparations for a large-scale war of aggression. They officially declared an adherence to the theory of "Socialism in One Country" according to which socialism can win in a single country, without being immediately overthrown by hostile capitalist neighbors. The leading country would then help revolutionary movements in other countries. Either way, the Soviet prewar doctrine was based on the Marxism-Leninism theory that capitalism will be overthrown through communist revolution.
- The Soviet Union made extensive preparations for a future war of aggression in the 1920s and the 1930s. Suvorov provides an extensive analysis of Stalin's preparations for war. According to Suvorov, there were supposed to be three Five-Year Plan phases to prepare the Soviet Union for war. The first focused on collectivization, the second on industrialisation, and the third on the militarization of the country.
- Stalin escalated tensions in Europe by providing a combination of economic and military support to Weimar Germany and later to Nazi Germany (see Germany–Soviet Union relations before 1941). After World War I, the Entente attempted to impose severe restrictions on Weimar Germany to prevent it from rearming and again becoming a significant military threat. During "the early 1920s until 1933, the Soviet Union was engaged in secret collaboration with the German military to enable it to circumvent the provisions of the Versailles Treaty", which limited Germany's military production. Moscow allowed the Germans to produce and test their weapons on Soviet territory, and some Red Army officers attended general-staff courses in Germany. The basis for that collaboration was the Treaty of Rapallo, signed between the two nations in 1922 and subsequent diplomatic interactions. The collaboration ended when the anticommunist Nazis took power in 1933. However, in 1932 and 1933, "Stalin helped Hitler come to power by forbidding German Communists to make common cause with the Social Democrats against the Nazis in parliamentary elections". Suvorov claims that Stalin's plan and vision was that Hitler's predictability and his violent reactionary ideas made him a candidate for the role of "icebreaker" for the communist revolution. By starting wars with European countries, Hitler would validate the Soviet entry into World War II by attacking Nazi Germany and "liberating" and Sovietizing all of Europe. When he concluded the Molotov–Ribbentrop Pact in 1939, Stalin "clearly counted on the repetition of the 1914–1918 war of attrition, which would leave the "capitalist" countries so exhausted that the USSR could sweep into Europe virtually unopposed" (see also Stalin's speech on August 19, 1939).
- According to Suvorov and others, Stalin always planned to exploit military conflict between the capitalist countries to his advantage. He said as early as 1925, "Struggles, conflicts and wars among our enemies are... our great ally... and the greatest supporter of our government and our revolution" and "If a war does break out, we will not sit with folded arms – we will have to take the field, but we will be last to do so. And we shall do so in order to throw the decisive load on the scale".
- World War II was initiated by the Soviet Union and Nazi Germany, which became co-belligerents after signing the Molotov–Ribbentrop Pact. The essence of the pact was in the secret protocols, which divided Europe into spheres of influence and removed the Polish buffer between Germany and the Soviet Union. Some countries that fell into the Soviet sphere of influence, Estonia and Latvia, were occupied. The difference between the smaller nations, occupied and annexed by the Soviets, and Poland, which was initially attacked by Germany, was that Poland had military assistance guarantees from the United Kingdom and France.
- Stalin planned to attack Nazi Germany from the rear in July 1941, only a few weeks after the date on which the Axis invasion of the Soviet Union took place. According to Suvorov, the Red Army had already redeployed from a defensive to an offensive stance. Suvorov also states that Stalin had made no major defensive preparations.
- Hitler's intelligence identified the Soviet preparations to attack Germany. Therefore, the Wehrmacht had drafted a pre-emptive war plan based on Hitler's orders as early as mid-1940, soon after the Soviet annexations of Bessarabia and Northern Bukovina. On June 22, 1941, the Axis began an assault on the Soviet Union.

The book is based on an analysis of Soviet military investments, diplomatic maneuvers, Politburo speeches and other circumstantial evidences.

== Reception ==
Icebreaker and subsequent books by Suvorov had sparkled what is currently known as "Suvorov's debates". Only a few authors now agree with Suvorov's main thesis about prewar Soviet plans for Europe conquest (another extreme view, expressed by Carley, is that the Soviets had no aggressive plans at all). It is currently believed that whereas the war against "capitalist powers" was seen as potentially inevitable by Soviet leadership and the Soviet Union was making some preparations for war, the Soviet pursuit for collective security system in Europe, or "Litvinov's line", was sincere in late 1930s, and the event that marked active Soviet war preparations was the rapid collapse of the Anglo-French alliance in 1940.

=== "Suvorov debates" ===
The Suvorov thesis about the preemptive strike by Hitler has been strongly criticised by many scholars, and the book was called "anti-Soviet" Most historians believe that Stalin was seeking to avoid war in 1941, as he believed that his military was not ready to fight the German forces. Many historians have written in response to Suvorov's views; Gabriel Gorodetsky and David Glantz authored books debunking his claims. Suvorov received some support from Valeri Danilov, Joachim Hoffmann, Mikhail Meltyukhov and Vladimir Nevezhin.

Glantz argues that the Soviet Union simply was not ready for the war in the summer of 1941 Robin Edmonds said that "the Red Army planning staff would not have been doing its job if it had not devoted some time between 1939 and 1941 to the possibility, at some future date, of a pre-emptive strike against Wehrmacht". David Brandenberger said that recently-published pre-1941 German analysis of Soviet military readiness came to conclusion that Soviet preparations were assessed to be "defensive" by German intelligence.

=== Public reception ===
The book was enthusiastically accepted by a fraction of a German society that hoped to reintroduce Hitler as a legitimate part of the patriotic historical discourse. In post-Soviet Russia, whose collapse of communist ideology coincided with the wave of criticism of Stalin's rule, the Icebreaker thesis about Stalin's responsibility for World War II outbreak and about Soviet plans for world conquest found a considerable support in many of society who wanted to disassociate themselves with the uncomfortable past.

== Editions ==
- — (1989). Le brise-glace [The icebreaker] (in French). Translated by Berelowitch, Madeleine; Berelowitch, Vladimir. Olivier Orban. ISBN 978-2-85565-478-2. OCLC 461996651. (First published edition)
- — (1990). Icebreaker: Who started the Second World War?. Translated by Beattie, Thomas B. London: Hamish Hamilton. ISBN 978-0-241-12622-6. OCLC 21407864. (First English edition) Also available as PDF with different pagination.
- — (1993). Icebreaker. London: Grafton. ISBN 978-0-586-21276-9. OCLC 24905790.
- — (2000). Ледокол : Кто начал Вторую мировую войну? [Icebreaker: Who started the Second World War?] (in Russian). Moscow: AST. ISBN 978-5-237-03370-0. OCLC 1288384665.
- — (2002). Ледокол : Кто начал Вторую мировую войну? [Icebreaker: Who started the Second World War?] (in Russian). Moscow: AST. ISBN 978-5-17-009249-9. OCLC 213444762.
- — (31 January 2006). Ледокол [Icebreaker] (in Russian). Archived from the original on 2011-02-20.
- — (March 2006). Ледокол: В пересказе автора [Icebreaker: As told by the author] (Audiobook) (in Russian). Bristol, UK: PL UK Publishing. ISBN 978-0-9552744-0-4. Read by the author. 4-CD set. Includes previously unpublished chapters.
- — (2009). Icebreaker: Who started the Second World War?. Translated by Kurr, Hans-Udo (Expanded and updated ed.). Bristol, UK: PL UK Publishing. ISBN 978-0-9552744-1-1. OCLC 759580324. ISBN 978-0-9552744-7-3. (in English)
- — (2014). Ледокол : Кто начал Вторую мировую войну? [Icebreaker: Who started the Second World War?] (Audiobook) (in Russian). Tallinn, Estonia: Estonian Library for the Blind. OCLC 1111078116. Read by Dmitri Kosjakov.
- — (2017). Ледокол: В пересказе автора [Icebreaker: As told by the author] (Audiobook) (in Russian). Moscow: Ardis Publishing. OCLC 1015315576. EAN 460-703176822-8. Read by the author. 192 Kbps, 44.1 kHz, stereo.

== See also ==
- Causes of World War II
- Germany–Soviet Union relations before 1941
- German–Soviet Axis talks
- Eastern Front (World War II)
- Soviet invasion of Poland
- Soviet offensive plans controversy
- Soviet–Polish Non-Aggression Pact
- Stalin's speech of 19 August 1939
