= Friedrich von Hellwald =

Austrian writer (1842–1892)

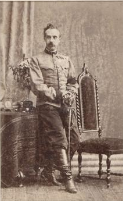
Friedrich von Hellwald, bef. 1877

Friedrich von Hellwald (29 March 1842 – 1 November 1892) was an Austrian writer on geography and the history of civilization.

== Biography ==
He was born on 29 March 1842 in Padua, Austrian Empire. He entered the Austrian Army in 1858, and was a lieutenant of cavalry (1866) in the war with Prussia. In 1866, he became an editor of the Austrian military magazine, Österreichische Militärische Zeitschrift. In 1872, he moved from Vienna to Cannstatt, where he succeeded Oscar Peschel as chief editor of Das Ausland. In this capacity, he emphasized subjects associated with anthropology and the history of civilization. In 1881, he resigned as editor of Das Ausland. He died in Cannstatt on 1 November 1892.

== Works ==
His many works, which are more popular than scientific, include:

- Maximilian I, Kaiser von Mexiko (Maximilian I of Mexico, Emperor of Mexico, 1869).
- Kulturgeschichte in ihrer natürlichen Entwicklung bis zur Gegenwart (Cultural history and its geographical development up to the present; 4th edition, 1896-98).
- Die Erde und ihre Völker (Earth and its peoples; 4th edition 1897).
- Die Russen in Centralasien. Eine Studie über die neueste Geographie und Geschichte Centralasiens (1873); later translated into English by Theodore Wirgman and published as "The Russians in Central Asia; a critical examination down to the present time of the geography and history of Central Asia" (1874).
- Naturgeschichte des Menschen (Natural history of the human race; 1883–84).
- Amerika in Wort und Bild (America in words and pictures; 1883–85).
- Frankreich in Wort und Bild (France in words and pictures; 1884–87).
- Hinterindische Länder und Völker. Reisen in den Flußgebieten des Irrawaddy und Mekong; in Birma, Annam, Kambodscha und Siam. (Burmese lands and peoples, travels in the river basins of the Irrawaddy and Mekong; in Burma, Annam, Cambodia and Siam; Leipzig 1880).
- Die menschliche Familie nach ihrer Entstehung und natürlichen Entwicklung (The human family, it origins and geographical development; 1889).
- Kulturbilder (1894) A posthumous work, edited by Theodor Möller.
