= Bibliography of the Battle of Britain =

List of English language works on the Battle of Britain

This general annotated bibliography page provides an overview of notable works in the English language regarding the Battle of Britain.

== General ==
- Allen, Hubert Raymond "Dizzy", Wing Commander RAF (1974). Who Won the Battle of Britain?. London: Arthur Barker. ISBN 978-0-213-16489-8..
- Bishop, Edward (1968). Their Finest Hour: The Story of the Battle of Britain, 1940. Ballantine Books.
- Bishop, Patrick (2010). Battle of Britain : a day-by-day chronicle, 10 July 1940 to 31 October 1940. London: Quercus. ISBN 978-1-84916-224-1.
- Botquin, Gaston & Roba, Jean-Louis (September 1998). "La Luftwaffe dans la campagne à l'Ouest et la Bataille d'Angleterre" [The Luftwaffe in the Western Campaign of the Battle of Britain]. Avions: Toute l'aéronautique et son histoire (in French) (66): 15–22. ISSN 1243-8650.
- Buckley, John. Air Power in the Age of Total War. London: UCL Press, 1999. ISBN 1-85728-589-1.
- Buell, Thomas. The Second World War: Europe and the Mediterranean. New York: Square One Publishers, 2002. ISBN 978-0-7570-0160-4.
- Bungay, Stephen (2000). The Most Dangerous Enemy : A History of the Battle of Britain. London: Aurum Press. ISBN 978-1-85410-721-3. (hardcover), 2002, ISBN 1-85410-801-8 (paperback). ISBN 978-1-78131-495-1 (2015 paperback edition)
- Collier, Basil. The Defence of the United Kingdom (1962, Official history)
- Collier, Basil. The Battle of Britain (1962, Batsford's British Battles series)
- Collier, Richard. Eagle Day: The Battle of Britain, 6 August – 15 September 1940. London: Pan Books, 1968.
- Churchill, Winston S (1949), The Second World War – Their Finest Hour (Volume 2), London: Cassell
- Churchill, Winston S. The Second World War – The Grand Alliance (Volume 3). Bantam Books, 1962.
- Crosby, Francis (2002). A Handbook of Fighter Aircraft: Featuring Photographs from the Imperial War Museum. Hermes House. ISBN 978-0-681-34256-9.
- Deighton, Len (1996). Fighter: The True Story of the Battle of Britain. London: Pimlico. ISBN 978-0-7126-7423-2. (Originally published: London: Jonathan Cape, 1977.) ISBN 0-7126-7423-3.
- Deighton, Len; Hastings, Max (1980). Battle of Britain. Diane Publishing Company. ISBN 978-0-7567-5077-0.
- Dye, Air Commodore Peter J. (Winter 2000), "Logistics and the Battle of Britain", Air Force Journal of Logistics, vol. 24, no. 4, archived from the original on 26 September 2010
- Ellis, John. Brute Force: Allied Strategy and Tactics in the Second World War. London: Andre Deutsch, 1990. ISBN 0-8264-8031-4.
- Evans, Michael. "Never in the field of human conflict was so much owed by so many to ... the Navy." The Times, 24 August 2006. Retrieved: 3 March 2007.
- Goodenough, Simon. War Maps: World War II, From September 1939 to August 1945, Air, Sea, and Land, Battle by Battle. New York: St. Martin's Press, 1982, ISBN 978-0-3128-5584-0.
- Halpenny, Bruce Barrymore (1984). Action Station 4: Military Airfields of Yorkshire. Cambridge, UK: Patrick Stevens. ISBN 978-0-85059-532-1.
- Harding, Thomas. "Battle of Britain was won at sea." The Telegraph, 25 August 2006. Retrieved: 25 August 2006.
- Holland, James (2011). The Battle of Britain. Transworld. ISBN 978-1-4070-6652-3.
- Hough, Richard; Richards, Denis (2007), The Battle of Britain: The Greatest Air Battle of World War II, New York: W.W. Norton & Co Inc, ISBN 978-0-393-02766-2
- Ingersoll, Ralph (1940), Report on England, November 1940, New York: Simon & Schuster
- Keegan, John. The Second World War London: Pimlico, 1997. ISBN 978-0-7126-7348-8.
- Korda, Michael (2010), With Wings Like Eagles: The Untold Story of the Battle of Britain, New York: Harper Perennial, ISBN 978-0-06-112536-2
- Manchester, William; Reid, Paul (2012). The Last Lion: Winston Spencer Churchill: Defender of the Realm, 1940–1965. Pan Macmillan. ISBN 978-1-4472-7954-9.
- Overy, R. J. (1980). The Air War, 1939–1945. Scarborough House. ISBN 978-0-8128-6156-3.
- Overy, Richard J. (2001). The Battle of Britain: The Myth and the Reality. New York: W.W. Norton. ISBN 978-0-393-02008-3. (hardcover, ISBN 0-393-32297-1 paperback, 2002)
- Overy, Richard J. (2013). The Bombing War : Europe 1939–1945. London & New York: Allen Lane. ISBN 978-0-7139-9561-9.
- Owen, R.E, New Zealanders with the Royal Air Force Government Printer, Wellington, New Zealand 1953.
- Pearson, Simon; Gorman, Ed (2020). Battle of Britain: The Pilots and Planes That Made History. London, United Kingdom: Hodder & Stoughton. ISBN 978-1-529-37807-8.
- Peszke, Michael Alfred (October 1980), "A Synopsis of Polish-Allied Military Agreements During World War Two", The Journal of Military History, 44 (3): 128–134
- Ponting, Clive (1991). 1940: Myth and Reality. I.R. Dee. ISBN 978-0-929587-68-4.
- Pope, Stephan. "Across the Ether: Part One". Aeroplane, Vol. 23, No. 5, Issue No. 265, May 1995.
- Price, Alfred (1980), The Hardest Day: 18 August 1940, New York: Charles Scribner's Sons, ISBN 978-0-684-16503-5
- Ramsay, Winston, ed. (1987), The Blitz Then and Now: Volume 1, London: Battle of Britain Prints International, ISBN 978-0-900913-45-7
- Ramsay, Winston, ed. (1988), The Blitz Then and Now: Volume 2, London: Battle of Britain Prints International, ISBN 978-0-900913-54-9
- Ramsay, Winston, ed. (1989), The Battle of Britain Then and Now Mk V, London: Battle of Britain Prints International, ISBN 978-0-900913-46-4
- Richards, Denis (1953). Royal Air Force 1939–1945. Vol. 1: The Fight at Odds 1939–1941. H.M. Stationery Office.
- Robinson, Derek, Invasion, 1940: Did the Battle of Britain Alone Stop Hitler? New York: Carroll & Graf, 2005. ISBN 0-7867-1618-5.
- Shulman, Milton. Defeat in the West. London: Cassell, 2004 (First edition 1947). ISBN 0-304-36603-X.
- Stacey, C P (1955). The Canadian Army 1939–1945 An Official Historical Summary. Ottawa: Queen's Printer.
- Stacey, C P. (1970) Arms, Men and Governments: The War Policies of Canada, 1939–1945 Queen's Printer, Ottawa (Downloadable PDF)
- Taylor, A. J. P.; Mayer, S. L., eds. (1974). A History of World War Two. London: Octopus Books. ISBN 978-0-7064-0399-2.
- Terraine, John (1985). The Right of the Line: The Royal Air Force in the European War, 1939-45. Hodder & Stroughton. ISBN 978-0-340-26644-1.
- Terraine, John, A Time for Courage: The Royal Air Force in the European War, 1939–1945. London: Macmillan, 1985. ISBN 978-0-02-616970-7.
- Winterbotham, F. W. (1975), The Ultra Secret, London: Futura Publications, ISBN 978-0-86007-268-3
- Wood, Derek; Dempster, Derek (2003). The Narrow Margin. Pen and Sword. ISBN 978-1-84884-314-1.
- Wright, Gordon (1968). The ordeal of total war, 1939–1945. Harper & Row. ISBN 978-0-06-131408-7.

== Luftwaffe ==
- Archambault, Claude (December 2000). "Affrontements meurtriers dans le ciel français, vus en 1940/41 par la 209.I.D." [Deadly Clashs in French Skies, Seen by the 208th Infantry Division]. Avions: Toute l'Aéronautique et son histoire (in French) (93): 9–16. ISSN 1243-8650.
- Archambault, Claude (January 2001). "Affrontements meurtriers dans le ciel français, vus en 1940/41 par la 209.I.D.". Avions: Toute l'Aéronautique et son histoire (in French) (94): 23–30. ISSN 1243-8650.
- Archambault, Claude (January 2000). "La Bataille d'Angleterre vue par la 227.I.D." [The Battle of Britain Viewed by the 227th Infantry Division]. Avions: Toute l'Aéronautique et Son Histoire (in French) (82): 13–17. ISSN 1243-8650.
- Corum, James. The Luftwaffe: Creating the Operational Air War, 1918–1940. Lawrence, Kansas: Kansas University Press, 1997. ISBN 0-7006-0836-2.
- de Zeng, Henry L., Doug G. Stankey and Eddie J. Creek. Bomber Units of the Luftwaffe 1933–1945: A Reference Source, Volume 1. Hersham, Surrey, UK: Ian Allan Publishing, 2007. ISBN 978-1-85780-279-5.
- Dildy, Douglas C. "The Air Battle for England: The Truth Behind the Failure of the Luftwaffe's Counter-Air Campaign in 1940." Air Power History 63.2 (2016): 27.
- Dönitz, Karl. Ten years and Twenty Days. New York: Da Capo Press, First Edition, 1997. ISBN 0-306-80764-5.
- Hooton, E.R. (2007). Luftwaffe at War: Blitzkrieg in the West, Vol. 2. London: Chevron/Ian Allan. ISBN 978-1-85780-272-6..
- Irving, David (1974), The Rise and Fall of the Luftwaffe: The Life of Field Marshal Erhard Milch, Dorney, Windsor, UK: Focal Point Publications, ISBN 978-0-297-76532-5
- Kieser, Egbert. Operation Sea Lion; The German Plan to Invade Britain 1940. London: Cassel Military Paperbacks, 1999. ISBN 0-304-35208-X.
- Macksey, Kenneth. Invasion: The German Invasion of England, July 1940. London: Greenhill Books, 1990. ISBN 0-85368-324-7.
- Magenheimer, Heinz (10 September 2015). Hitler's War: Germany's Key Strategic Decisions 1940–45. Orion. ISBN 978-1-4746-0275-4.
- Mason, Francis K. Battle Over Britain: A History of the German Air Assaults on Great Britain, 1917–18 and July–December 1940, and the Development of Air Defences Between the World Wars. New York: Doubleday, 1969. ISBN 978-0-901928-00-9.
- Murray, Williamson (2002). Strategy for defeat : the Luftwaffe, 1933–1945. Honolulu, Hawaii: University Press of the Pacific. ISBN 978-0-89875-797-2.
- Prien, Jochen; Stemmer, Gerhard; Rodeike, Peter; Bock, Winfried (2002). Die Jagdfliegerverbände der Deutschen Luftwaffe 1934 bis 1945—Teil 4/I—Einsatz am Kanal und über England—26.6.1940 bis 21.6.1941 [The Fighter Units of the German Air Force 1934 to 1945—Part 4/I—Action at the Channel and over England—26 June 1940 to 21 June 1941] (in German). Eutin, Germany: Struve-Druck. ISBN 978-3-923457-63-2.
- Raeder, Erich. Erich Rader, Grand Admiral. New York: Da Capo Press; United States Naval Institute, 2001. ISBN 0-306-80962-1.
- Shirer, William (1990) [1964], The Rise and Fall of the Third Reich: A History of Nazi Germany, London: Ballantine, ISBN 978-0-449-21977-5
- Smith, Howard Kingsbury (1942). Last Train from Berlin. A. A. Knopf.
- Stedman, Robert F. (2012). Jagdflieger: Luftwaffe Fighter Pilot 1939–45. Bloomsbury Publishing. ISBN 978-1-78096-983-1.
- Wagner, Ray; Nowarra, Heinz (1971). German Combat Planes: A Comprehensive Survey and History of the Development of German Military Aircraft from 1914 to 194. New York: Doubleday & Company.
- Watteau, Pierre (June 2000). "Courrier des Lecteurs" [Readers' Letters]. Avions: Toute l'Aéronautique et son histoire (in French) (87): 3. ISSN 1243-8650.

== Autobiographies and biographies ==
- Brew, Steve. A Ruddy Awful Waste: Eric Lock DSO, DFC & Bar; The Brief Life of a Battle of Britain Fighter Ace. London: Fighting High, 2016.
- Collier, Basil. Leader of the Few: the Authorised Biography of Air Chief Marshal Lord Dowding of Bentley Priory. London: Jarrolds, 1957.
- Deere, Alan Christopher (1974), Nine Lives, London: Hodder Paperbacks Ltd for Coronet Books, ISBN 978-0-340-01441-7
- Duncan Smith, W. G. G. (2002). Spitfire into Battle. Hodder & Stoughton. ISBN 978-0-7195-5484-1.
- Franks, Norman, Wings of Freedom: Twelve Battle of Britain Pilots. London: William Kimber, 1980. ISBN 0-7183-0197-8.
- Galland, Adolf (2005). The First and the Last: Germany's Fighter Force in the Second World War. Cerberus. ISBN 978-1-84145-020-9.
- Halpenny, Bruce, Fight for the Sky: Stories of Wartime Fighter Pilots. Cambridge, UK: Patrick Stephens, 1986. ISBN 0-85059-749-8.
- Halpenny, Bruce, Fighter Pilots in World War II: True Stories of Frontline Air Combat (paperback). Barnsley, UK: Pen and Sword Books Ltd, 2004. ISBN 1-84415-065-8.
- Orange, Vincent (2001). Park: The Biography of Air Chief Marshal Sir Keith Park, GCB, KBE, MC, DFC, DCL. Grub Street Publishers. ISBN 978-1-909166-72-1.

== Aircraft ==
- Ansell, Mark (2005). Boulton Paul Defiant: Technical Details and History of the Famous British Night Fighter. Redbourn, Herts, UK: Mushroom Model Publications. pp. 712–714. ISBN 978-83-89450-19-7..
- de Zeng, Henry L., Doug G. Stankey and Eddie J. Creek, Bomber Units of the Luftwaffe 1933–1945: A Reference Source, Volume 2. Hersham, Surrey, UK: Ian Allan Publishing, 2007. ISBN 978-1-903223-87-1.
- Feist, Uwe (1993). The Fighting Me 109. London: Arms and Armour Press. ISBN 978-1-85409-209-0..
- Goss, Chris, Dornier 17: In Focus. Surrey, UK: Red Kite Books, 2005. ISBN 0-9546201-4-3.
- Green, William (1962). Famous Fighters of the Second World War. London: Macdonald and Jane's Publishers Ltd.
- Green, William (1980) [First edition, 1970]. Warplanes of the Third Reich. London: Macdonald and Jane's Publishers Ltd. ISBN 978-0-356-02382-3.
- Harvey-Bailey, Alec (1995). Merlin in Perspective: The Combat Years. Derby, UK: Rolls-Royce Heritage Trust. ISBN 978-1-8729-2206-5..
- Holmes, Tony (1998). Hurricane Aces 1939–1940 (Aircraft of the Aces). Botley, Oxford, UK: Osprey Publishing. ISBN 978-1-85532-597-5.
- Holmes, Tony (2007), Spitfire vs Bf 109: Battle of Britain, Oxford: Osprey, ISBN 978-1-84603-190-8
- Huntley, Ian D., Fairey Battle, Aviation Guide 1. Bedford, UK: SAM Publications, 2004. ISBN 0-9533465-9-5.
- Jones, Robert C. (1970). Camouflage and Markings Number 8: Boulton Paul Defiant, RAF Northern Europe 1936–45. London: Ducimus Book Limited.
- Lloyd, Sir Ian; Pugh, Peter (2004). Hives and the Merlin. Cambridge: Icon Books. ISBN 978-1-84046-644-7.
- Mason, Francis K., Hawker Aircraft since 1920. London: Putnam, 1991. ISBN 0-85177-839-9.
- McKinstry, Leo (2010). Hurricane: Victor of the Battle of Britain. Hodder & Stoughton. ISBN 978-1-84854-394-2.
- Molson, Kenneth M. et al., Canada's National Aviation Museum: Its History and Collections. Ottawa: National Aviation Museum, 1988. ISBN 978-0-660-12001-0.
- Moyes, Philip, J. R., "The Fairey Battle." Aircraft in Profile, Volume 2 (nos. 25–48). Windsor, Berkshire, UK: Profile Publications, 1971. ISBN 0-85383-011-8
- Parry, Simon W., Intruders over Britain: The Story of the Luftwaffe's Night Intruder Force, the Fernnachtjager. Washington, DC: Smithsonian Books, 1989. ISBN 0-904811-07-7.
- Price, Alfred (1996), Spitfire Mark I/II Aces 1939–41 (Aircraft of the Aces 12), London: Osprey Books, ISBN 978-1-85532-627-9
- Price, Alfred (2002), The Spitfire Story: Revised second edition, Enderby, Leicester, UK: Silverdale Books, ISBN 978-1-85605-702-8
- Sarkar, Dilip (2011). How the Spitfire Won the Battle of Britain. Amberley Publishing Limited. ISBN 978-1-4456-0981-2.
- Scutts, Jerry, Messerschmitt Bf 109: The Operational Record. Sarasota, Florida: Crestline Publishers, 1996. ISBN 978-0-7603-0262-0.
- Ward, John (2004). Hitler's Stuka Squadrons: The JU 87 at War 1936–1945. MBI Publishing Company LLC. ISBN 978-0-7603-1991-8.
- Warner, G (2005), The Bristol Blenheim: A Complete History (2nd ed.), London: Crécy Publishing, ISBN 978-0-85979-101-4
- Weal, John (1999), Messerschmitt Bf 110 'Zerstōrer' Aces of World War 2, Botley, Oxford, UK: Osprey Publishing, ISBN 978-1-85532-753-5

== Additional references ==
- Addison, Paul and Jeremy Crang. The Burning Blue: A New History of the Battle of Britain. London: Pimlico, 2000. ISBN 0-7126-6475-0.
- Bergström, Christer. Barbarossa – The Air Battle: July–December 1941. London: Chevron/Ian Allan, 2007. ISBN 978-1-85780-270-2.
- Bergström, Christer. The Battle of Britain – An Epic Battle Revisited. Eskilstuna: Vaktel Books/Casemate, 2010. ISBN 978-1-61200-347-4.
- Bishop, Patrick. Fighter Boys: The Battle of Britain, 1940. New York: Viking, 2003 (hardcover, ISBN 0-670-03230-1); Penguin Books, 2004. ISBN 0-14-200466-9. As Fighter Boys: Saving Britain 1940. London: Harper Perennial, 2004. ISBN 0-00-653204-7.
- Brittain, Vera. England's Hour. London: Continuum International Publishing Group, 2005 (paperback, ISBN 0-8264-8031-4); Obscure Press (paperback, ISBN 1-84664-834-3).
- Campion, Garry (2008), The Good Fight: Battle of Britain Wartime Propaganda and The Few (First ed.), Basingstoke, Hampshire, UK: Palgrave Macmillan, ISBN 978-0-230-27996-4.
- Campion, Garry (2015), The Battle of Britain, 1945–1965: The Air Ministry and the Few, Palgrave Macmillan, ISBN 978-0-230-28454-8
- Cooper, Matthew. The German Air Force 1933–1945: An Anatomy of Failure. New York: Jane's Publishing Incorporated, 1981. ISBN 0-531-03733-9.
- Craig, Phil and Tim Clayton. Finest Hour: The Battle of Britain. New York: Simon & Schuster, 2000. ISBN 0-684-86930-6 (hardcover); 2006, ISBN 0-684-86931-4 (paperback).
- Cumming, Anthony J. The Royal Navy and The Battle of Britain. Annapolis, Maryland: Naval Institute Press, 2010. ISBN 978-1-59114-160-0.
- Fiedler, Arkady. 303 Squadron: The Legendary Battle of Britain Fighter Squadron. Los Angeles: Aquila Polonica, 2010. ISBN 978-1-60772-004-1.
- Fisher, David E. A Summer Bright and Terrible: Winston Churchill, Lord Dowding, Radar and the Impossible Triumph of the Battle of Britain. Emeryville, CA: Shoemaker & Hoard, 2005. (hardcover, ISBN 1-59376-047-7); 2006, ISBN 1-59376-116-3 (paperback).
- Foreman, John (1988), Battle of Britain: The Forgotten Months, November And December 1940, New Malden: Air Research Publications, ISBN 1-871187-02-8
- Gaskin, Margaret. Blitz: The Story of 29 December 1940. New York: Harcourt, 2006. ISBN 0-15-101404-3.
- Gretzyngier, Robert; Matusiak, Wojtek (1998). Polish Aces of World War 2. London: Osprey. ISBN 978-1-85532-726-9..
- Haining, Peter (2005). The Chianti Raiders: The Extraordinary Story of the Italian Air Force in the Battle of Britain. Pavilion Books. ISBN 978-1-86105-829-4.
- Haining, Peter. Where the Eagle Landed: The Mystery of the German Invasion of Britain, 1940. London: Robson Books, 2004. ISBN 1-86105-750-4.
- Halpenny, Bruce Barrymore. Action Stations: Military Airfields of Greater London v. 8. Cambridge, UK: Patrick Stephens, 1984. ISBN 0-85039-885-1.
- Harding, Thomas. "It's baloney, say RAF aces". The Telegraph, 24 August 2006. Retrieved: 3 March 2007.
- Hough, Richard. The Battle of Britain: The Greatest Air Battle of World War II. New York: W.W. Norton, 1989. ISBN 0-393-02766-X (hardcover); 2005, ISBN 0-393-30734-4(paperback).
- James, T.C.G. The Battle of Britain (Air Defence of Great Britain; vol. 2). London/New York: Frank Cass Publishers, 2000. ISBN 0-7146-5123-0(hardcover); ISBN 0-7146-8149-0 (paperback, ).
- James, T.C.G. Growth of Fighter Command, 1936–1940 (Air Defence of Great Britain; vol. 1). London; New York: Frank Cass Publishers, 2000. ISBN 0-7146-5118-4.
- James, T.C.G. Night Air Defence During the Blitz. London/New York: Frank Cass Publishers, 2003. ISBN 0-7146-5166-4.
- McGlashan, Kenneth B. with Owen P. Zupp. Down to Earth: A Fighter Pilot Recounts His Experiences of Dunkirk, the Battle of Britain, Dieppe, D-Day and Beyond. London: Grub Street Publishing, 2007. ISBN 1-904943-84-5.
- March, Edgar J. British Destroyers; a History of Development 1892–1953. London: Seely Service & Co. Limited, 1966.
- Olson, Lynne; Cloud, Stanley (2003). A Question of Honor: The Kościuszko Squadron: Forgotten Heroes of World War II. New York: Knopf. ISBN 978-0-375-41197-7.. NB: This book is also published under the following title:
  - For Your Freedom and Ours: The Kościuszko Squadron – Forgotten Heroes of World War II.
- Mason, Francis K. "Battle over Britain". McWhirter Twins Ltd. 1969 {A day by day accounting of RaF and Luftwaffe losses}
- Prien, Jochen and Peter Rodeike.Messerschmitt Bf 109 F, G, and K: An Illustrated Study. Atglen, Pennsylvania: Schiffer Publishing, 1995. ISBN 0-88740-424-3.
- Ray, John Philip (2003). The Battle of Britain: Dowding and the First Victory, 1940. Cassell. ISBN 978-0-304-35677-5.
- Ray, John Philip. The Battle of Britain: New Perspectives: Behind the Scenes of the Great Air War. London: Arms & Armour Press, 1994 (hardcover, ISBN 1-85409-229-4); London: Orion Publishing, 1996 (paperback, ISBN 1-85409-345-2).
- Rongers, Eppo H. De oorlog in mei '40, Utrecht/Antwerpen: Uitgeverij Het Spectrum N.V., 1969, No ISBN
- Townsend, Peter. Duel of Eagles (new edition). London: Phoenix, 2000. ISBN 1-84212-211-8.
- Wellum, Geoffrey. First Light: The Story of the Boy Who Became a Man in the War-Torn Skies Above Britain. New York: Viking Books, 2002. ISBN 0-670-91248-4 (hardcover); Hoboken, NJ: Wiley & Sons, 2003. ISBN 0-471-42627-X (hardcover); London: Penguin Books, 2003. ISBN 0-14-100814-8 (paperback).
- Zaloga, Steven J.; Hook, Richard (1982). The Polish Army 1939–45. London: Osprey. ISBN 978-0-85045-417-8..
