= Heinz Magenheimer =

Austrian military historian

- Born: January 21, 1943 (age 83); Vienna
- Education: University of Vienna
- Occupations: Military historian, historical revisionist

Heinz Magenheimer (born January 21, 1943) is an Austrian military historian known for advancing the discredited theory of a preemptive strike by the Wehrmacht against the Soviet Union.

== Education and career ==
Magenheimer joined the Austrian Army as an officer candidate in 1961 after his matura at the Bundesrealgymnasium Wien V in Margareten. From 1962 to 1965, he was enrolled in officer's training at the Theresian Military Academy but did not graduate with a degree. Magenheimer then enrolled at the University of Vienna in 1965 and, four years later in 1969, wrote his dissertation at the Department of Contemporary History under Ludwig Jedlicka and Heinrich Appelt as his advisers.

In October 1972, Magenheimer became a Referent at the Vienna National Defense Academy's Institute for Basic Strategic Research and, until 2000, became a Hofrat and deputy head of the Institute's research department. In 1982 he became a lecturer of military policy at the University of Salzburg, where he would complete his habilitation in 1991. That same year, Magenheimer became a professor of international relations and contemporary and military history at the University of Salzburg's Department of Political Science and Sociology.

Since 1975, Magenheimer has published articles in various history periodicals such as the Austrian Military Journal, where since 1985 he has been on the editorial board. He is the author the history series Deutsche Geschichte - Europa und die Welt, published by right-wing publishing company Berg.

== Controversies ==
Magenheimer has argued that the Molotov–Ribbentrop Pact of 1939 was disadvantageous to Germany, a view that Austrian historian Alexander Pollack criticized in his 2002 book Die Wehrmachtslegende in Österreich.

In his 1995 work Kriegswenden in Europa 1939-1945 Magenheimer contended that, until the summer of 1940, the Nazi Party had "developed a suitable recipe for the political and economic reorganization of Europe in the sense of a universally satisfactory understanding between nations," that Germany's attack on the Soviet Union had "opened the door to the unknown," and the Battle of Moscow could have been won if the Wehrmacht had attacked ten days before the Soviet counterattack. An observer in the Frankfurter Allgemeine Zeitung criticized Magenheimer for welcoming more lasting German victories and for regarding it as a "European law enforcement agency" despite its invasions of Poland, France, and the Low Countries in 1939 and 1940. In 2005, Magenheimer portrayed the Wehrmacht as fighting a "heroic and legitimate defensive battle" against the Red Army in the last years of the Second World War, particularly the evacuation of refugees from East Prussia in 1944–45. Historians dismissed the notion, pointing out that Nazi propaganda and obstructions prevented a larger evacuation.

Magenheimer appeared publicly to criticize both versions of the Wehrmacht Exhibition. He is partly responsible for the lack of criticism by the Austrian Armed Forces of their participation in the Shoah since 1945. He has written a festschrift in honor of British Holocaust denier and revisionist David Irving, written a piece on the air war since refuted by Gerd R. Ueberschär, and has advocated for revisionist historiography in the right-wing newspaper Junge Freiheit, leading to his consideration as a representative of the Neue Rechte.

Magenheimer has maintained that the Iraq War was a war of aggression by the United States spun as a preventive war that broke international law enshrined in the UN Charter. He judged preventive war as justifiable, but that America's invasion was an unfit response for the threat of weapons of mass destruction and international terrorism.

=== Preemptive strike myth ===
Since 1990, Magenheimer has consistently postulated the theory Stalin planned an attack on Nazi Germany before June 1941, which was superseded by Operation Barbarossa. In 1991, he referred to a concept paper on the "strategic deployment of Soviet forces" from 15 May 1941 that he discovered when the Soviet archives were opened in 1990. He published the paper in the Österreichische Militärische Zeitschrift along with an essay by Russian military historian Valeri Danilov that attributed corrections made in pencil lead to then Georgy Zhukov and alleged that he authorized the plan.

He first proposed the idea in his 1969 dissertation, making Magenheimer among the earliest proponents of the myth. He is thus considered the main proponent of the theory and has been cited by Walter Post, Wolfgang Strauß, Joachim Hoffmann, Werner Maser, Ernst Nolte, Franz W. Seidler, and Ernst Topitsch.

== Bibliography ==
- Der deutsche Angriff auf Sowjetrussland 1941. Das operative Problem in Planung und Ablauf des Feldzuges. Dissertation #54, University of Vienna, 1969.
- Die Entwicklung des Wehrwesens im Bereich der Pakte sowie der Neutralen und Blockfreien Europas. Institute for Basic Strategic Research at the National Defense Academy of Vienna, 1976
