= The Journal of Slavic Military Studies =

- Discipline: Slavic studies, military studies
- Language: English
- Edited by: Martijn Lak

Publication details
- Former name: The Journal of Soviet Military Studies
- History: 1988–present
- Publisher: Routledge
- Frequency: Quarterly

Standard abbreviations
- ISO 4: J. Slav. Mil. Stud.

Indexing
- CODEN: JSMTE8
- ISSN: 1351-8046 (print); 1556-3006 (web)
- LCCN: 93641610
- OCLC no.: 56751630

Links
- Journal homepage; Online access; Online archive

The Journal of Slavic Military Studies is a quarterly peer-reviewed academic journal that publishes articles relating to military affairs of Central and Eastern European Slavic nations, including their history and geopolitics, as well as book reviews. It is published by Routledge and the editor-in-chief is Martijn Lak. It was established in 1988 by David Glantz as The Journal of Soviet Military Studies, obtaining its current title in 1993. David Glantz was editor-in-chief from the founding of the journal until the end of 2017, with Alexander Hill briefly editing the journal from January 2018 until March 2019.

As of 2014, it is ranked in the first quartile of the SCImago Journal Rank of scholarly journals in the history category.

== Abstracting and indexing ==
The journal is abstracted and indexed in:

- American Bibliography of Slavic and Eastern European Studies
- America: History & Life
- CSA Worldwide Political Science Abstracts
- EBSCOhost
- International Bibliography of the Social Sciences
- International Political Science Abstracts
- Lancaster Index to Defence & International Security Literature
- ProQuest databases
- Scopus.
