= Stalin's speech of 19 August 1939 =

Secret speech allegedly given by Joseph Stalin

A secret speech was allegedly given by Joseph Stalin, on 19 August 1939, to members of the Politburo, wherein he justified the Soviet strategy to promote military conflict in Europe, which would be beneficial for the future territorial expansion of the Communist system. The strategy included Soviet-Nazi collaboration and the suggestion of what has become the Molotov–Ribbentrop Pact.

The historicity of the speech is still the subject of academic debate. Plausible textual evidence of this speech found in various reputable archives has been academically studied and published, however no formal first-hand evidence of a Politburo meeting held on 19 August 1939 or the delivery of the quoted speech has yet been proven.

== Source material and timeline ==
The first version of this speech was published partially on 28 November 1939, in the Paris newspaper Le Temps by the news agency Havas despatch from Geneva. Since then several versions, varying in content, have been in circulation.

In 1994, the Russian publicist Tatiana Bushuyeva (Russian: Татьяна Семеновна Бушуева) published the text of the speech in an article printed in the Novy Mir magazine based on what she claimed was recent findings in the Special Archive of the USSR of a text, which according to her was supposedly recorded by a Comintern member present at the meeting (and she published the Russian translation thereof). Sergey Sluch questions its authenticity remarking that the document was in French and stored in the "Trophies Funds" of the Archive, and that the text mostly matches the one from Havas, but Bushueva skipped some dubious passages.

== Historicity and debate ==
Whether this speech was ever given by Stalin is still the subject of dispute by historians. According to Viktor Suvorov's book Icebreaker, Soviet historians laid special emphasis on claiming that no Politburo meeting took place on 19 August 1939, but the Russian military historian Dmitri Volkogonov has found the evidence that a meeting really took place on that day. However the only military issue in the agenda of the meeting, according to Volkogonov, was the deferment from conscription of the construction workers of the Akmolinsk–Kartaly railway.

The speech took place according to research book Stalin's Missed Chance by the military historian Mikhail Meltyukhov, which covers the alleged offensive plans by Stalin. However, the third edition of the book, in 2008, omits any mention of 1939 speech.

Historian Sergey Sluch of the Russian Academy of Sciences also reviewed the history of the subject.
