= Mark Solonin =

Russian historian and author (born 1958)

- Марк Семенович Солонин
- Born: April 29, 1958 (age 68); Kuybyshev, Russian SFSR, Soviet Union
- Citizenship: Russian
- Education: Kuibyshev Aviation Institute
- Occupation: Historian
- Children: 2
- Writing career
- Language: Russian
- Years active: 1981 - Present
- Genre: Soviet history
- Subject: History

Mark Solonin (born May 29, 1958, in Kuybyshev, Soviet Union) is a Russian historian and author of numerous books on the Second World War. An aviation engineer by training, he has lived since 2016 in Estonia. In 2019 he relocated to Ukraine. Since 2022 he lives in Kyiv.

== Early life ==
Mark Semionovich Solonin (Russian: Марк Семёнович Солонин) was born in Kuybyshev, Soviet Union, on May 29, 1958. With a father who had served with the Soviet Army in the Second World War, he developed strong interest in history as a boy. After graduating from secondary school with a golden medal (cum laude), he decided to study not history but aviation engineering to avoid Soviet politics from interfering with his potential career in history.

== Career ==
Solonin's work focuses on the opening phase of the Soviet–German War and the causes of the Red Army's catastrophic defeats in 1941. He argues that conventional explanations such as strategic surprise, German material superiority, encirclement, and Soviet operational shortcomings are insufficient to explain the overall character of the 1941 catastrophe, including the scale of Soviet losses, the comparatively small losses suffered by German forces, and the speed and depth of the German advance. He stresses that the Red Army possessed very large manpower and matériel resources, that catastrophic defeats continued well after the initial surprise of June 22, and that contemporary Soviet and German operational records often document combat losses far smaller than the total subsequent disappearance of personnel and matériel from Soviet formations. He points in particular to exceptionally high numbers of personnel reported missing or captured relative to those killed, and to the disappearance of millions of small arms and thousands of artillery pieces, tanks, and aircraft. Solonin interprets these patterns as evidence that the Red Army ceased to function as an organized military force, manifested in mass surrender and desertion, widespread abandonment of weapons and equipment, disintegration of command and obedience, and a loss of motivation among many soldiers to fight for the Soviet state.

Separately, Solonin supports the view that Stalin was preparing the Soviet Union for an offensive war against Germany in 1941. He bases this conclusion on successive Soviet strategic deployment plans calling for offensive operations beyond the Soviet frontier, together with the secret mobilization of reservists, westward concentration of forces, and movement of higher command structures undertaken in May and June 1941, which he interprets as preparations for an approaching large-scale offensive rather than merely general contingency planning.

Solonin criticized the new Russian Minister of Culture and historian Vladimir Medinsky as "a propagandist of the shameless Goebbels variety".

== Bibliography ==
- Solonin, Mark (2006). На мирно спящих аэродромах [At The Sleeping Airfields] (in Russian). Moscow: Eksmo. ISBN 5-699-15695-X.
- Solonin, Mark (2007). 23 июня: "День М [June 23: M-Day] (in Russian). Moscow: Eksmo. ISBN 978-5-699-22304-6.
- Solonin, Mark (2008). 25 июня. Глупость или агрессия? [June 25: Foolishness or Aggression?] (in Russian). Moscow: Eksmo. ISBN 978-5-699-25300-5.
- Solonin, Mark (2008). Мозгоимение: Фальшивая история Великой войны [The Fake History of the Great War] (in Russian). Moscow: Eksmo. ISBN 978-5-699-28327-9.
- Solonin, Mark (2008). 22 июня. Анатомия катастрофы [June 22. Anatomy of Catastrophe] (in Russian). Moscow: Eksmo. ISBN 978-5-699-30295-6.
- Solonin, Mark (2011). Новая хронология катастрофы [A New Chronology Of The 1941 Invasion] (in Russian). Moscow: Eksmo. ISBN 978-5-699-51036-8.
- Solonin, Mark (2013). Июнь 41-го. Окончательный диагноз [June 1941: The Final Diagnosis] (in Russian). Moscow: Eksmo. ISBN 978-5-699-67335-3.
- Solonin, Mark (2021), Spring Victory: Stalin's Glossed Over Crime, (in English), Independently Published/Amazon, ISBN 979-8519589222
- Solonin, Mark (2021), Two Essays: Coming Up From Behind or How the Soviet Union Won the War and If World Domination is the Aim then Strike First!, (in English), Independently Published/Amazon, ISBN 979-8494370945

== See also ==
- Soviet offensive plans controversy
- Battle of Białystok–Minsk
- Operation Barbarossa
