= Academy of Military Science (Russia) =

Russian research organization

Academy of Military Science (Russian: Академия военных наук Российской Федерации) is a Russian non-governmental research interregional public organization. Conducts basic and applied military research, and has headquarters in Moscow.

Public organization "Academy of Military Sciences" was registered in the Ministry of Justice of the Russian Federation, June 3, 1994 (certificate of registration No.2278). Creation of an organization approved February 20, 1995, decree of the President of the Russian Federation. Since its founding, academic and Army General Makhmut Gareev served as its president until his death in 2019. Army General Valery Gerasimov, Chief of the General Staff and commander of all Russian forces in Ukraine, has served as its president since 2021.

== Overview ==
Academy brings together scientists of the Armed Forces (AF), FSB, MVD, other security agencies and defense industries, as well as civilian scientists. By the end of 2005 the academy had 584 active members, 270 corresponding members, 38 honorary members, and 1,254 professors. About 30% of the members of the academy are serving members of the Russian Armed Forces and other security agencies.

The academy has relationships with Russian research centers and scientific organizations of the CIS countries, the Russian Academy of Sciences, the Russian Academy of Rocket and Artillery Sciences, the National Academy of Sciences of Belarus, the Military Academy of the General Staff of the Russian Armed Forces, the Military University of the Russian Defense Ministry, the Institute of Military History of the Ministry of Defense of Russia League for defense companies, MGIMO and other universities, research institutes, departmental and public research institutions.

== Fields of research ==
- study of the nature of military threats to Russia's security and ways to prevent wars and armed conflicts;
- study of the composition and content of Russia's national interests and how to ensure its military security;
- development of scientific bases of the military doctrine, military reform and collective defense organization of the CIS;
- prediction of future warfare and methods of using the armed forces;

develop recommendations for the construction and development of the Armed Forces of Russia;

- development of scientific proposals for the reduction of strategic offensive arms in the states possessing nuclear weapons;
- study of the problems of possible appearance of weapons based on new physical principles and its impact on the forms and methods of warfare;
- study of the problems of warfare in space and ongoing from space;
- development of the project concept of military reform, covering problems converting all defense structures of the state;
- study of the peculiarities of training and operations and combat operations in local wars and armed conflicts;
- development problems of creation of the Eurasian Union and ways to strengthen collective military security within the CIS;
- study and development of forms and methods of operational and combat training with limited logistical resources for their maintenance;
- development of the ideological basis of military indoctrination new Russian army.
