= Mikhail Meltyukhov =

Russian military historian (born 1966)

Mikhail Ivanovich Meltyukhov (Russian: Михаил Иванович Мельтюхов, pronounced [mʲɪxɐˈil ɨˈvanəvʲɪtɕ mʲɪlʲtʲʊˈxof]; born 14 March 1966) is a Russian military historian.

Meltyukhov was born in Moscow.

In 1995, he defended the dissertation “Contemporary Historiography on Pre-history of the German-Soviet War” on historiography concerning the beginning of World War II. Since then, he has published several studies, many of which are notable for the critical review of the official Soviet conceptions of World War II. Some important works in this direction are On the Verge of the Great Patriotic War: the Debate Goes on and Stalin's Missed Chance and "Soviet-Polish Wars: Military and Political Standoff in 1918-1939".

Meltyukhov also contributed to a recently-published collection of articles on Viktor Suvorov's ideas. Meltyukhov supported some ideas of Suvorov in general but criticised him for inaccuracies. Meltyukhov's latest work, Stalin's Liberation Campaign, dealt with Joseph Stalin's attempts to regain the 'lost territories' of the Russian Empire like Bessarabia. He presents a hypothesis that it was precisely during the Soviet occupation of Bessarabia that Adolf Hitler decided to invade the Soviet Union because he realised that the Red Army could quickly cut Germany from its oil reserves in Romania by a strike on Bessarabia. That thesis had been put forward by Viktor Suvorov, who described Soviet preparations for the strike.

An English version of some of his work has been published as "Disputes over 1941" by M I Mel'tiukhov in the series Russian Studies in History.

Meltyukhov's Soviet-Polish Wars: Military and Political Confrontation in 1918-1939 was criticised by the Polish historian Andrzej Nowak. According to Nowak, Meltyukhov interpreted Polish-Soviet conflicts as “fragments of eternal Western aggression against Russia”. Russian and Soviet aggressions “are presented as purely defensive postures”, which presents Soviet crimes in occupied Poland “as a ‘peacekeeping mission’” In his 2004 book, Nowak lists in detail biases and inaccuracies concerning Polish-Russian relations in Meltyukhov's book by primarily pointing out that Poland is always portrayed as an aggressor and that many instances of Russian aggression toward Poland are ignored.^{[a]}

Meltyukhov's study Stalin's Missed Chance has also been valued positively for covering Soviet military plans before the 1941 outbreak of the German-Soviet War by relying on documents that had been inaccessible. In 2020, Meltyukhov contributed to the Russian Federal archival project "Crimes of the Nazis and their accomplices against the civilian population of the USSR during the Great Patriotic War 1941-1945".

Meltyukhov was also a professor at Moscow Technological University.

== Bibliography ==
- М. И. Мельтюхов, Д. М. Проэктор Блицкриг в Европе, 1939 - 1941. Польша. AST, Terra Fantastica, 2004. ISBN 5-17-018623-1, 5-7921-0416-6
- Современнная отечественнная историографии предистории Великой Отечественнной войны (1985–1995). Дисссертация. Москва, 1995
- Канун Великой Отечественнной войны: дискуссия продолжается. Москва, 1995
- Упущенный шанс Сталина. Советский Союз и борьба за Европу: 1939-1941 (Документы, факты, суждения). - М.: Вече, 2000 ISBN 5-7838-0590-4 (second edition was published in 2004)
- Освободительный поход Сталина. Яуза, Эксмо, 2006. ISBN 5-699-17275-0
- Преддверие Великой Отечественной войны 1939-1941 гг.: становление великой державы. in: Правда Виктора Суворова. Переписывая историю Второй Мировой. Яуза, 2006 c. 31-108. ISBN 5-87849-214-8
- Великая Отечественная катастрофа. Трагедия 1941 года. 2007. (a collection of articles, authors: Meltyukhov, Solonin, Viktor Suvorov, M.Baryatinsky, Y.Mukhin)
