= Alexander Nekrich =

Russian historian (1920–1993)

Aleksandr Moiseyevich Nekrich (3 March 1920, Baku, Azerbaijan Democratic Republic – 31 August 1993, Boston, Massachusetts) was a Soviet Russian historian. He immigrated to the United States in 1976. He is known for his works on the history of the Soviet Union, especially under Joseph Stalin’s rule.

== History ==
Born in Baku, Azerbaijan, Nekrich fought in the Red Army ranks during World War II and subsequently graduated from the Moscow University with a degree in history. In 1950, he joined the Russian Academy of Sciences Institute of General History as a senior researcher and a secretary of that institute’s party cell.

Nekrich gained fame for his sensational work June 22, 1941; Soviet Historians and the German Invasion, a study of the Soviet-German confrontation during World War II, which was critical of Stalin and the Soviet leadership over their failure to prepare the country for an anticipated German onslaught. The book was harshly criticized and quickly banned, while Nekrich was excluded from the Communist party. He was allowed, though, to leave the Soviet Union in 1976. Nekrich settled in the U.S. and lectured at Harvard. In emigration, Nekrich published his memoirs (1979), wrote The Punished Peoples: The Deportation and Fate of Soviet Minorities at the End of the Second World War (1978), and coauthored, with Mikhail Heller, Utopia in Power: The History of the Soviet Union from 1917 to the Present (1982).
