= Vladimir Nevezhin =

Russian historian

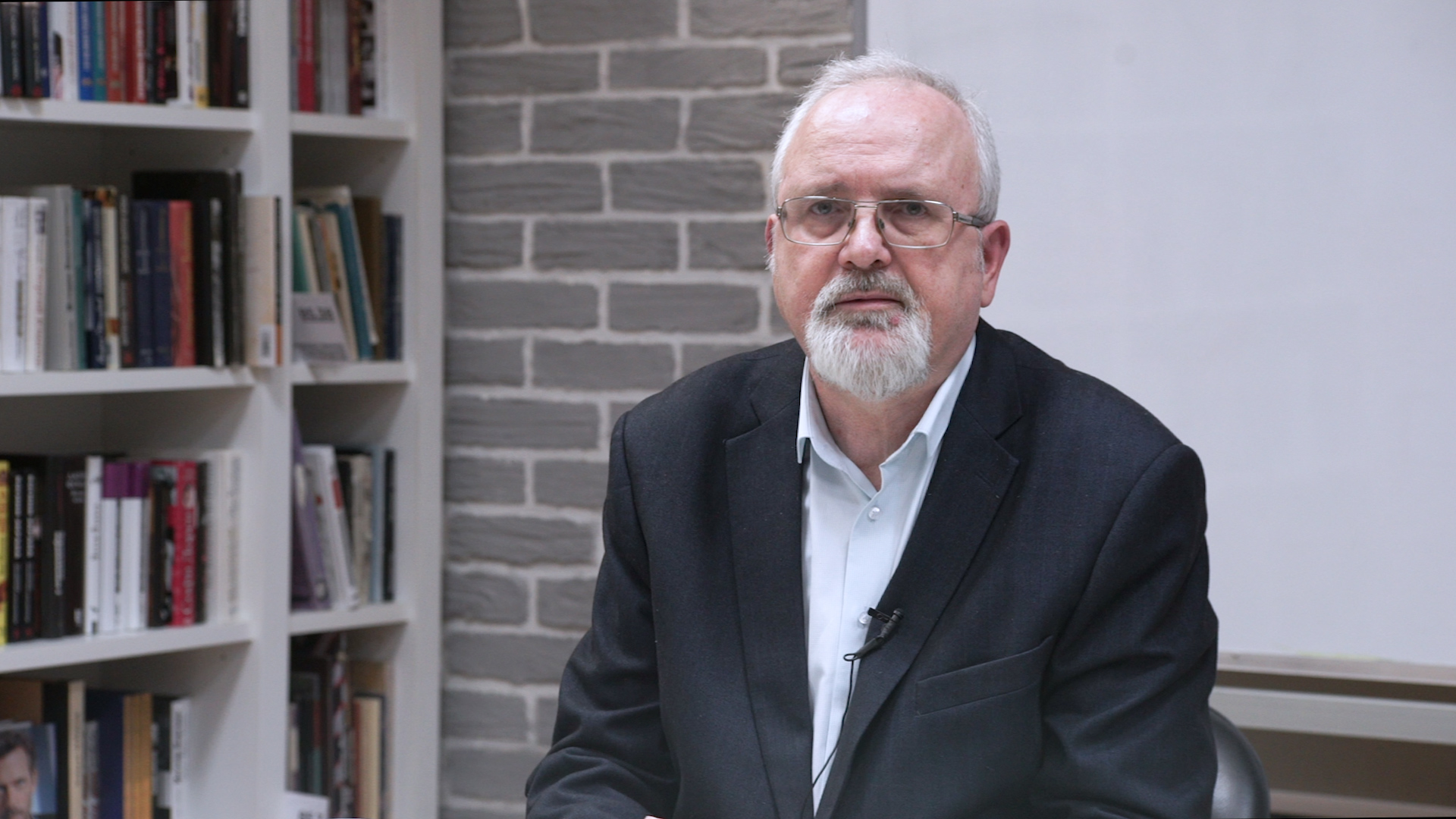
Photo of Vladimir Nevezhin in 2019

Vladimir Nevezhin (Russian: Владимир Александрович Невежин) is a Russian historian (Doctor of History Sciences), is working as a professor in Moscow, chief scientific collaborator at the Institute of Russian History (of the Russian Academy of Science) and member of the editorial board of the journal Отечественная история (History of the Fatherland).

During the 1990s, he took part in the discussion and dispute over the pre-history of the Great Patriotic War. Nevezhin has analysed the content of Stalin's speeches, propagandistic directives in spring 1941 and notes of the contemporaries, drawing conclusions that the numerous documents unambiguously expressed the preparations of the country for an offensive in 1941.

== See also ==
- Soviet offensive plans controversy

== Bibliography ==
- Советская политика и культурные связи с Германией (1939-1941 гг.) (The Soviet Cultural Ties with Germany (from 1939 to 1941))
- В.А.Невежин. Речь Сталина 5 мая 1941 года и апология наступательной войны (The Speech by Stalin on May 5, 1941 and the Apology of an Offensive War) published in Отечественная история, 1995, № 2, с. 54-69 online
- В.А. Невежин Советская пропаганда и идеологическая подготовка к войне (вторая половина 30-х - начало 40-х гг.) М., 1999.
- Невежин В.А. Синдром наступательной войны. Советская пропаганда в преддверии "священных боев" 1939-1941. М.: АИРО-ХХ, 1997. (Syndrom of Offensive War. Soviet Propaganda on the Threshold of “Holy Battles” 1939-1941)
- Невежин В.А. Стратегические замыслы Сталина накануне 22 июня 1941 года (По итогам «незапланированной дискуссии» российских историков) in Отечественная история 1999: 5, С. 110
- В.А.Невежин Стратегические замыслы Сталина накануне 22 июня 1941 года (По итогам "незапланированной дискуссии" российских историков) published in Отечественная история, 1999, № 5, с. 108-124. online
- В. А. Невежин Застольные речи Сталина. Документы и материалы. Moscow: АИРО-XX; СПб.: Дмитрий Буланин, 2003 ISBN 5-88735-111-X
