= Makhmut Gareev =

Soviet general (1923–2019)

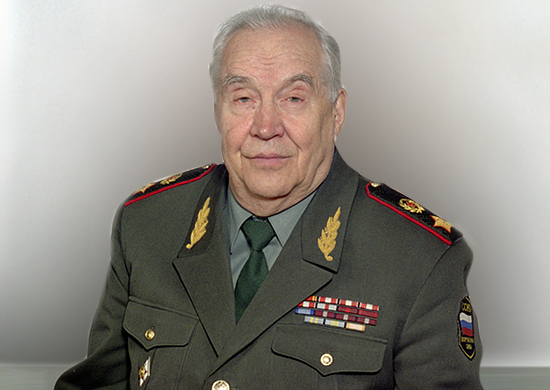
- Born: Makhmut Akhmetovich Gareyev; 23 June 1923; Chelyabinsk, RSFSR, USSR
- Died: 25 December 2019 (aged 96); Moscow, Russia
- Military career
- Allegiance: Soviet Union; Russia
- Branch: Soviet Army
- Service years: 1941–1992
- Rank: General of the Army
- Commands: Chief Adviser to the President Democratic Republic of Afghanistan – Chief of the Armed Forces DRA; President of the Academy of Military Sciences
- Conflicts: World War II; Soviet–Afghan War; First Afghan Civil War
- Awards: Order of Lenin; Order of the Red Banner (4 times); Order of Alexander Nevsky; Order of the Patriotic War (1st and 2nd class); Order of the Red Banner of Labour; Order of the Red Star; Order for Service to the Homeland in the Armed Forces of the USSR (2nd and 3rd class)

Makhmut Akhmetovich Gareev (Russian: Махмут Ахметович Гареев, Tatar: Мәхмүт Әхмәт улы Гәрәев; 23 July 1923 – 25 December 2019), also spelled Gareyev, was a Soviet and Russian General of the Army, military theorist and historian. A veteran of the Second World War, he served as deputy chief of the Soviet General Staff from 1984, and was the chief Soviet military adviser in Afghanistan after the withdrawal of Soviet troops in 1989. From 1995 until his death, he was the president of the Academy of Military Sciences. He wrote more than 100 scholarly works on military theory and the history of the war, and in 1998 he became the first winner of the Russian State Prize named after Georgy Zhukov.

== Early life ==
Gareev was born on 23 July 1923 in Chelyabinsk, into a Tatar family. His paternal grandfather had been a peasant from the village of Salikhovo in the Chishminsky District of Bashkiria. His father, Akhmetdin, worked in a pharmacy, and his mother, Rahima, came from the village of Alabaevo in the Tetyushsky District of Tatarstan and had studied for nine years at a madrasa in Kazan. He had a younger brother, Makhsut, and a younger sister, Fauziya. The family later moved to Uzbekistan, and he spent his childhood and youth in Central Asia.

== Military career ==
As a boy, Gareev was taken on as a ward of a cavalry regiment. On 14 May 1941, he became a cadet at the Tashkent Infantry School. After the German invasion of the Soviet Union, the cadets took a shortened course, and in November 1941 he graduated early as a platoon commander. In 1942, he attended the Vystrel advanced courses for infantry officers.

=== Second World War ===
Gareev as soldier in the Red Army during World War II

Gareev fought on the Western Front and the 3rd Belorussian Front. He was first seriously wounded in August 1942, in the fighting near Rzhev. After serving as a deputy battalion commander, he moved to staff posts at brigade and corps level. In the spring of 1944, he became assistant head of the operations department of the staff of the 45th Rifle Corps of the 5th Army, part of the 3rd Belorussian Front. He was wounded in the head later that year. After leaving hospital, he became a senior officer in the operations department of the 5th Army staff, and he received a concussion in the fighting in East Prussia in the spring of 1945. In total, he was wounded four times during the war.

In August and September 1945, Gareev served as assistant head of the operations department of the 5th Army staff, in the 1st Far Eastern Front, during the Soviet invasion of Manchuria. He took part in planning and carrying out the operation, and he was awarded the Order of Alexander Nevsky for his part in it. He ended the war as a major.

=== Post-war career ===
After the war, Gareev served in the Primorsky Military District, and in 1946 and 1947 he was a military adviser to the Chinese People's Liberation Army. In September 1947, he entered the Frunze Military Academy, from which he graduated with a gold medal in 1950. He then served in the Belorussian Military District, first as chief of staff of a rifle regiment and then as a senior officer in the operations directorate of the district staff. From 1955 to 1957, he was chief of staff of the 120th Guards Rifle Division. In 1957, he entered the Military Academy of the General Staff, and he graduated with a gold medal in 1959.

From November 1959 to September 1970, Gareev held a series of posts, as deputy commander of a motor rifle division, commander of a training regiment, deputy commander and then commander of a tank division, and chief of staff and first deputy commander of an army. From February 1965, he commanded the 50th Guards Motor Rifle Division of the 28th Army. In 1968, he was appointed chief of staff of the 28th Army.

In 1970, Gareev was sent to Egypt as chief of staff to the Soviet chief military adviser there, and he served in that post until 1971. After returning to the Soviet Union in December 1971, he was appointed chief of staff of the Ural Military District. In February 1974, he became head of the Military-Scientific Directorate of the General Staff, and he later served as deputy head of its Main Operations Directorate. In 1984, he was appointed a deputy chief of the General Staff. As deputy chairman of the main editorial commission, he took part in preparing the Soviet Military Encyclopedia, and he also contributed to the 12-volume Soviet history of the Second World War.

Mary C. FitzGerald, an analyst at the Center for Naval Analyses, wrote that Gareev, then a colonel general and deputy chief of the General Staff, echoed the views of Marshal Nikolai Ogarkov on a "turning point" in military science brought about by new precision conventional weapons in NATO countries. She noted that in his 1985 book on Mikhail Frunze, Gareev wrote that many of the central propositions of Marshal Vasily Sokolovsky's classic Military Strategy had become obsolete. She regarded this as the first official rejection of Sokolovsky's work.

=== Afghanistan ===
Gareev decorated by President of Afghanistan Mohammad Najibullah during the Soviet-Afghan War

As the decision to withdraw Soviet troops from Afghanistan, it was decided to send Gareev to the country as military adviser to its government. In February 1989, Gareev, then a colonel general, went to Kabul as chief military adviser to the Afghan president Mohammad Najibullah. According to the analyst Simon Saradzhyan, Gareev recalled that the Soviet defence minister Dmitry Yazov told him that his task was to make sure that Najibullah's government survived for at least three or four months, in the hope that a political settlement could be reached in that time. Gareev later wrote that, once the government had survived for a year, some senior officials of the KGB and the foreign ministry began to call for offensive operations, and that he had difficulty persuading leaders in Moscow to give up these plans. He was promoted to General of the Army in November 1989. He returned to the Soviet Union in September 1990.

Gareev described his time in Afghanistan in his book Moya poslednyaya voina (My Last War). The American military analyst Lester W. Grau called it "the pivotal work" on the Soviet withdrawal and its aftermath.

== Later career ==
President of Russia Vladimir Putin greets Gareev during the 2015 Victory Day parade in Moscow

From 1990, Gareev served as a military adviser and inspector in the Group of Inspectors General of the Soviet Ministry of Defence. He retired from active service in 1992, and he later served as a general inspector of the Russian Ministry of Defence. In February 1995, he was elected the first president of the Academy of Military Sciences, which he had founded, and he led it until his death. From 2013, he headed a public council under the chairman of the Military-Industrial Commission of the Russian government, and he was deputy chairman of the public council of the Ministry of Defence.

Gareev was a member of the Russian Academy of Natural Sciences and the Tatarstan Academy of Sciences. The president of Tatarstan gave him the title of Honoured Scientist of the Republic of Tatarstan. On 2 September 2015, President of China Xi Jinping presented him with a commemorative medal at the Great Hall of the People in Beijing, as one of ten foreign veterans honoured for their part in the war against Japan. China Daily described him as a Soviet Army veteran who had fought alongside Chinese soldiers in northeast China. In May 2018, Russian President Vladimir Putin awarded him the Russian Order of Alexander Nevsky.

== Military science and history ==
Gareev at a military conference (2012)

Gareev wrote more than 100 scholarly works and more than 300 articles. He received a doctorate in military sciences in 1982, and in 1992 he received a second doctorate, in history, for a dissertation on Frunze's military theory. His book Marshal Zhukov: Velichie i unikalnost polkovodcheskogo iskusstva (Marshal Zhukov: The Greatness and Uniqueness of His Art of Command, 1996) won him the G. K. Zhukov State Prize of the Russian Federation in 1998, of which he was the first winner. His book If War Comes Tomorrow? was published in English in 1998, with an introduction by the American historian Jacob Kipp. The South African reviewer G. E. Vreÿ wrote that it set out much of Russian military thinking about future war.

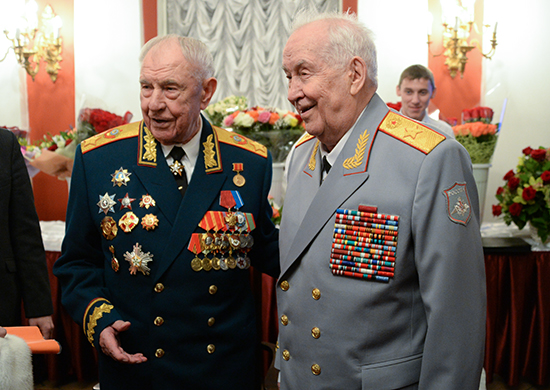
Gareev with Marshal of the Soviet Union Dmitry Yazov (2014)

Gareev served on the commission that worked to establish Soviet human losses in the Second World War. The historians R. A. Mukhamedov and I. A. Chukanov wrote that the idea of protecting the memory of the Soviet victory ran through all of his articles. He argued that no one should be allowed to revise the results of the war. According to Business Online, his historical research helped to establish the truth about the poet Musa Jalil, who was posthumously made a Hero of the Soviet Union.

== Personal life ==
In 1951, Gareev married Tamara Ivanovna Lazareva. They had a daughter, Galiya, born in 1952, and a son, Timur, born in 1961. His wife died in 1998.

== Death and legacy ==
Gareev died in Moscow on 25 December 2019, at the age of 96. A funeral prayer was held at the Moscow Cathedral Mosque, where the chairman of the Council of Muftis of Russia Ravil Gaynutdin described him as a true patriot and a true believer. He was buried with military honours at the Federal Military Memorial Cemetery in Mytishchi. Defence minister of Russia Sergei Shoigu, said at the funeral that the country was saying goodbye to a great citizen.

In May 2020, the mayor of Kazan Ilsur Metshin announced that a new street in the city's Kirovsky District would be named after Gareev. In June 2023, a national scholarly conference was held in Kazan to mark the centenary of his birth. On 28 August 2025, the head of Tatarstan, Rustam Minnikhanov, unveiled a bust of Gareev next to Lyceum No. 188 in Kazan.

== Honours and awards ==
Gareev received 19 orders and 30 medals. Some of them include:

- Order of Lenin (1989)
- Order of the Red Banner, four times (1944, 1945, 1967 and 1982)
- Order of Alexander Nevsky, twice (1945 and 2018)
- Order of the Patriotic War, 1st class (1985) and 2nd class (1944)
- Order of the Red Banner of Labour (1981)
- Order of the Red Star, three times (1942, 1943 and 1956)
- Order "For Service to the Homeland in the Armed Forces of the USSR", 2nd class (1975) and 3rd class (1986)
- Honoured Scientist of the Republic of Tatarstan
- M. V. Frunze Prize (1987)
- Order "For Merit to the Fatherland", 3rd class (2013)
- Order of Alexander Nevsky (2018)
- Order of Honour (1999)
- Order of Friendship (2003)
- G. K. Zhukov State Prize (1998)
- Commemorative medal for the 70th anniversary of the victory in the war against Japan (China, 2015)

== Selected works ==
- M. V. Frunze, Military Theorist. Washington, D.C.: Pergamon-Brassey's, 1987. ISBN 978-0-08-035183-4
- Neodnoznachnye stranitsy voiny: Ocherki o problemnykh voprosakh istorii Velikoi Otechestvennoi voiny. Moscow: RFM, 1995. ISBN 978-5-88793-001-5
- Marshal Zhukov: Velichie i unikalnost polkovodcheskogo iskusstva. Vostochnyi universitet, 1996. ISBN 978-5-87865-109-7
- Moia posledniaia voina: Afganistan bez sovetskikh voisk. Moscow: INSAN, 1996. ISBN 978-5-85840-277-0
- Konturen des bewaffneten Kampfes der Zukunft: Ein Ausblick auf das Militärwesen in den nächsten 10 bis 15 Jahren. Baden-Baden: Nomos, 1996. ISBN 978-3-7890-3938-6
- If War Comes Tomorrow? The Contours of Future Armed Conflict. London: Frank Cass, 1998. ISBN 978-0-7146-4368-7
