= David M. Glantz =

American military historian (born 1942)

David Glantz
- Born: January 11, 1942 (age 84); Port Chester, New York, U.S.

Academic background
- Education: Virginia Military Institute; University of North Carolina at Chapel Hill

Academic work
- Main interests: Military historian (history of warfare, World War II, Soviet Union in World War II)
- Notable works: Stalingrad trilogy (3 volumes); When Titans Clashed: How the Red Army Stopped Hitler and other works on the Red Army; Journal of Slavic Military Studies
- Notable ideas: Soviet operational art
- Military career
- Allegiance: United States of America
- Branch: United States Army
- Service years: 1963–1993
- Rank: Colonel
- Conflicts: Vietnam War

David M. Glantz (born January 11, 1942) is an American military historian known for his books on the Red Army during World War II and as the chief editor of The Journal of Slavic Military Studies.

== Education ==
Born in Port Chester, New York, Glantz received degrees in history from the Virginia Military Institute and the University of North Carolina at Chapel Hill. He is a graduate of the U.S. Army Command and General Staff College, Defense Language Institute, Institute for Russian and Eastern European Studies, and U.S. Army War College.

Glantz had a career of more than 30 years in the U.S. Army, served in the Vietnam War, and retired as a colonel in 1993.

== Teaching career ==
Glantz was a Mark W. Clark visiting professor of History at The Citadel, The Military College of South Carolina.

== Activity after retirement ==
Glantz is known as a military historian of the Soviet role in World War II.

He has argued that the view of the Soviet Union's involvement in the war has been prejudiced in the West, which relies too much on German oral and printed sources without being balanced by a similar examination of Soviet source material. Fellow historian Jonathan Haslam, in a review about his book on Operation Mars, criticized him for some of his stylistic choices, such as hypothetical thoughts and feelings of historical figures apart from references to documented sources.

== Awards and honors ==
- 2000 Samuel Eliot Morison Prize for lifetime achievement given by the Society for Military History
- 2020 Pritzker Literature Award for lifetime achievement

== Studies for the US Army ==
- "Soviet Offensive Ground Doctrine Since 1945", Air University Review, March–April 1983
- 1984 Art of War symposium, From the Don to the Dnepr: Soviet Offensive Operations – December 1942 – August 1943, A transcript of Proceedings, Center for Land Warfare, US Army War College, 26–30 March 1984
- 1985 Art of War symposium, From the Dnepr to the Vistula: Soviet Offensive Operations – November 1943 – August 1944, A transcript of Proceedings, Center for Land Warfare, US Army War College, 29–3 May 1985
- 1986 Art of War symposium, From the Vistula to the Oder: Soviet Offensive Operations – October 1944 – March 1945, A transcript of Proceedings, Center for Land Warfare, US Army War College, 19–23 May 1986
- August Storm: The Soviet Strategic Offensive in Manchuria by David M. Glantz (PDF)
- August Storm: Soviet Tactical and Operational Combat in Manchuria, 1945 by LTC David M. Glantz (PDF)
- The Soviet Airborne Experience by LTC David M. Glantz
- Soviet Defensive Tactics at Kursk, July 1943 by COL David M. Glantz

== Books ==
- Soviet Military Deception in the Second World War. London: Frank Cass. 1989. ISBN 978-0-7146-3347-3.
- The Role of Intelligence in Soviet Military Strategy in World War II. Novato, California: Presidio Press. 1990. ISBN 978-0-89141-380-6.
- Soviet Military Operational Art: In Pursuit of Deep Battle. London; Portland, Oregon: F. Cass. 1991. ISBN 978-0-7146-4077-8.
- From the Don to the Dnepr: Soviet Offensive Operations, December 1942 – August 1943. London; Portland, Oregon: F. Cass. 1991. ISBN 978-0-7146-3350-3.
- The Military Strategy of the Soviet Union: A History. London; Portland, Oregon: F. Cass. 1992. ISBN 978-0-7146-3435-7.
- The History of Soviet Airborne Forces (1994) ISBN 0-7146-3483-2
- Soviet Documents on the Use of War Experience: The Winter Campaign, 1941–1942 (Cass Series on the Soviet Study of War, 2), David M. Glantz (Editor), Harold S. Orenstein (Editor)
- When Titans Clashed: How the Red Army Stopped Hitler (1995) ISBN 0-7006-0717-X
- The Initial Period of War on the Eastern Front, 22 June – August 1941: Proceedings of the Fourth Art of War Symposium, Garmisch, October 1987 (Cass Series on Soviet Military Experience, 2), edited by Colonel David M. Glantz, Routledge (1997) ISBN 978-0-7146-4298-7
- Stumbling Colossus: The Red Army on the Eve of World War (1998) ISBN 0-7006-0879-6
- Kharkov 1942: Anatomy of a Military Disaster (1998) ISBN 1-885119-54-2
  - Reviewed by John Erickson in The Journal of Military History, Vol. 63, No. 2 (April 1999), pp. 482–483, doi:10.2307/120691, JSTOR 120691.
- Zhukov's Greatest Defeat: The Red Army's Epic Disaster in Operation Mars, 1942 (1999) ISBN 0-7006-0944-X
- Foreword to Forging Stalin's Army: Marshal Tukhachevsky and the Politics of Military Innovation by Sally Stoecker
- The Battle of Kursk (1999) ISBN 0-7006-0978-4
- Barbarossa: Hitler's Invasion of Russia 1941 (2001) ISBN 0-7524-1979-X
- Captured Soviet Generals: The Fate of Soviet Generals Captured by the Germans, 1941–1945, Aleksander A. Maslov, edited and translated by David M. Glantz and Harold S. Orenstein, Routledge; first edition (2001), ISBN 978-0-7146-5124-8
- The Siege of Leningrad, 1941–1944: 900 Days of Terror (2001) ISBN 0-7603-0941-8
- Belorussia 1944: The Soviet General Staff Study, Soviet Union Raboche-Krestianskaia Krasnaia Armiia Generalnyi Shtab, Glantz, David M. (Editor), Orenstein, Harold S. (Editor), Frank Cass & Co, 2001 ISBN 978-0-7146-5102-6
- The Battle for Leningrad, 1941–1944 (2002) ISBN 0-7006-1208-4
- Before Stalingrad: Barbarossa, Hitler's Invasion of Russia 1941 (Battles & Campaigns), Tempus, 2003 ISBN 978-0-7524-2692-1
- Battle for the Ukraine: The Korsun'-Shevchenkovskii Operation (Soviet (Russian) Study of War), Frank Cass Publishers, 2003 ISBN 0-7146-5278-4
- The Soviet Strategic Offensive in Manchuria, 1945: August Storm (2003) ISBN 0-7146-5279-2
- Atlas and Operational Summary: The Border Battles, 22 June–1 July 1941; daily situation maps prepared by Michael Avanzini, Publisher: David Glantz, 2003
- Hitler and His Generals: Military Conferences 1942–1945: The First Complete Stenographic Record of the Military Situation Conferences, from Stalingrad to Berlin, Helmut Heiber and David M. Glantz editors (English edition), Enigma Books; (2005) ISBN 978-1-929631-28-5
- Colossus Reborn: The Red Army at War, 1941–1943 (2005) ISBN 0-7006-1353-6
- Companion to Colossus Reborn: Key Documents and Statistics (2005) ISBN 0-7006-1359-5
- Red Storm Over the Balkans: The Failed Soviet Invasion of Romania, Spring 1944 (2006) ISBN 0-7006-1465-6
- Stalingrad: How the Red Army Survived the German Onslaught, Casemate Publishers and Book Distributors, Jones, Michael K. (Author), Glantz, David M. (Foreword) 2007 ISBN 978-1-932033-72-4
- To the Gates of Stalingrad: Soviet-German Combat Operations, April–August 1942 (The Stalingrad Trilogy, Volume 1) (Modern War Studies) with Jonathan M. House, University Press of Kansas, 2009
- Armageddon in Stalingrad: September–November 1942 (The Stalingrad Trilogy, Volume 2) (Modern War Studies) with Jonathan M. House, University Press of Kansas, 2009
- Endgame at Stalingrad: November 1942 (The Stalingrad Trilogy, Volume 3, Book 1) (Modern War Studies) with Jonathan M. House, University Press of Kansas, 2014
- Endgame at Stalingrad: November 1942 (The Stalingrad Trilogy, Volume 3, Book 2) (Modern War Studies) with Jonathan M. House, University Press of Kansas, 2014
- After Stalingrad: The Red Army's Winter Offensive 1942–1943 ISBN 978-1-906033-26-2
- Barbarossa Derailed: The Battle for Smolensk, 10 July–10 September 1941 Volume 1, Helion & Company, 2010; ISBN 1906033722
- Barbarossa Derailed: The Battle for Smolensk, 10 July–10 September 1941 Volume 2, Helion & Company, 2012; ISBN 1906033900
- Barbarossa Derailed: The Battle for Smolensk, 10 July–10 September 1941 Volume 3, Helion & Company, 2014; ISBN 1909982113
- with Mary E. Glantz. The Battle for Belorussia: The Red Army's Forgotten Campaign of October 1943 – April 1944, University Press of Kansas, 2016; ISBN 0700623299
- Operation Don's Main Attack: The Soviet Southern Front's Advance on Rostov, January–February 1943, University Press of Kansas, 2018
- Operation Don's Left Wing: The Trans-Caucasus Front's Pursuit of the First Panzer Army, November 1942–February 1943, University Press of Kansas, 2019

== See also ==
- Battle of Kursk
- Eastern Front (World War II)
- Operation Barbarossa
- Red Army
- Russian military deception
- Siege of Leningrad
- Slavistics
- Soviet offensive plans controversy
