= Gabriel Gorodetsky =

Israeli academic

- גבריאל גורודצקי
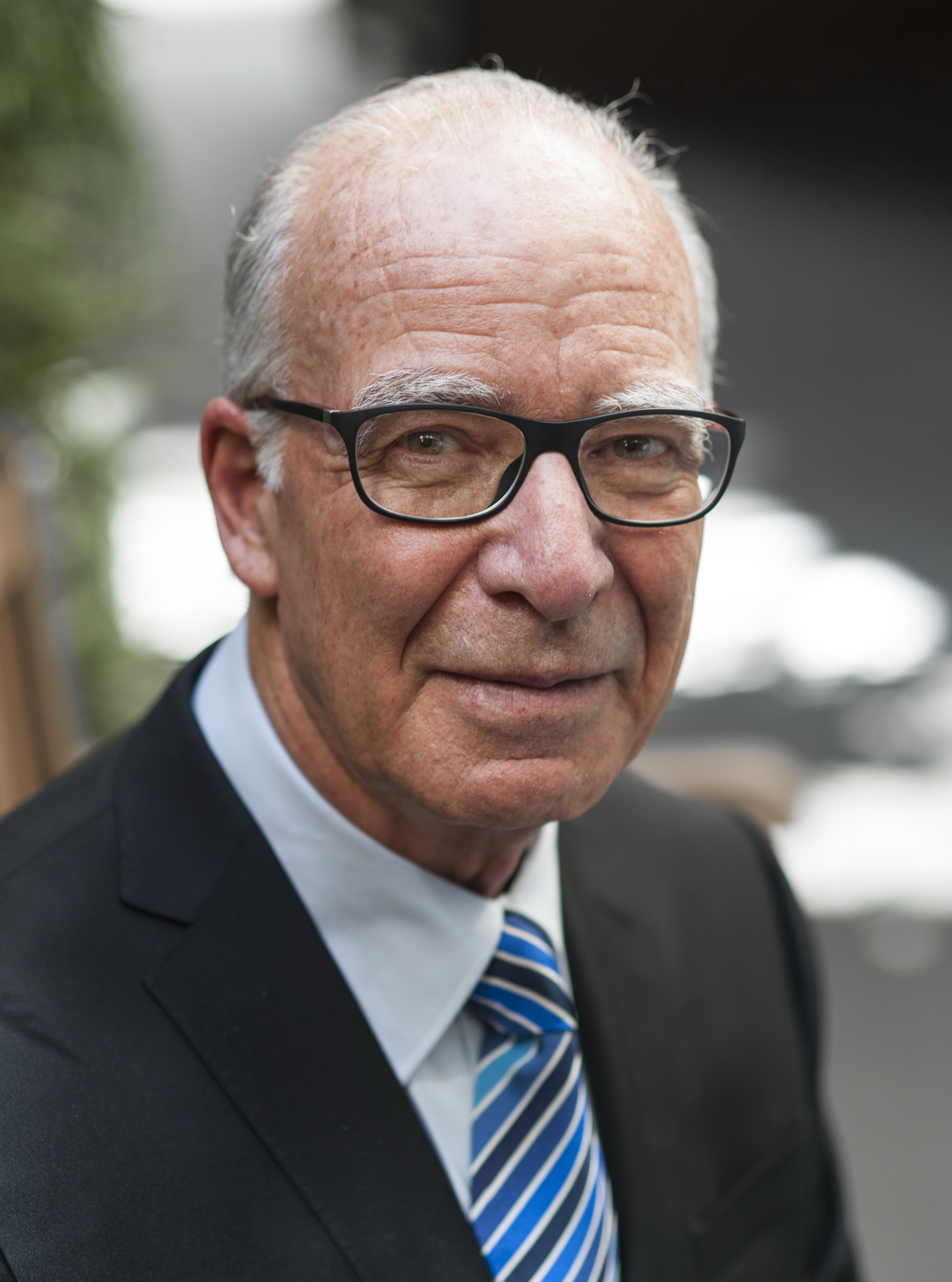
- Portrait
- Born: 13 May 1945 (age 81); Tel Aviv, Mandatory Palestine
- Education: University of Oxford
- Spouse: Ruth Herz
- Scientific career
- Fields: History
- Workplaces: Tel Aviv University
- Doctoral advisor: E. H. Carr

Gabriel Gorodetsky (Hebrew: גבריאל גורודצקי; born 13 May 1945) is an Israeli academic who is the Quondam Fellow of All Souls College, Oxford, and emeritus professor of history at Tel Aviv University. Gorodetsky studied History and Russian Studies at the Hebrew University in Jerusalem and went on to obtain his Ph.D. degree under the supervision of British historian E. H. Carr in Oxford. He was the director of the Cummings Center for Russian Studies at Tel Aviv University from 1991 to 2007. He has been a visiting fellow of St. Antony's College in Oxford in 1979 and in 1993, of the Woodrow Wilson International Center for Scholars in Washington in 1986, of All Souls in Oxford in 2006, and a visiting scholar at the Institute for Advanced Study in Princeton. Gorodetsky was also a visiting professor at LMU Munich and the University of Cologne, and at the Central European University in Budapest. In 2010, Gorodetsky received an honorary doctorate from the Russian State University for the Humanities in Moscow.

He is married to Ruth Herz, a jurist from Cologne, judge in the RTL Television court show Das Jugendgericht (2001–2005), research fellow of the Centre of Criminology at the University of Oxford, author of Recht Persönlich (Beck, 2006) and The Art of Justice: The Judge's Perspective (Hart Publishing, Oxford, 2013).

== Research ==
In his book Grand Delusion: Stalin and the German Invasion of Russia (Yale University Press, 1999), Gorodetsky said that Stalin was committed to realpolitik and eager to improve the Soviet Union's national status. It had lost position as a result of the disasters during the First World War and the Russian Revolution. According to Gorodetsky, through the Molotov–Ribbentrop Pact, Stalin believed he could bring about a change in the European balance of power. When he learnt through his intelligence of Hitler's aggressive intentions in late 1930s, he had no choice but to resort to appeasement, hoping he could either delay the war or reach a second agreement with Hitler. Stalin's purges of the 1930s had decapitated the military and left it in a dismal state.

== Books ==
- The Precarious Truce: Anglo-Soviet Relations, 1924-1927 (Cambridge University Press, 1977, reissued in 2008). (284 pp.)
- Soviet Foreign Policy, 1917-1991: A Retrospective (Frank Cass, London, 1994) (227 pp.)
- Stafford Cripps' Mission to Moscow, 1940-1942 (Cambridge University Press, 1984) (361 pp.) (Revised reprint in paperback, Cambridge University Press, 2002).
- Mif Ledokola (Moscow, Progress, 1995) (350 pp.). (In Russian: The Icebreaker Myth).
- Grand Delusion: Stalin and the German Invasion of Russia (Yale, University Press, 1999) (550 pp.). (paperback edition, 2001)
- Le Grand Jeu de Dupes (French translation, Belles Lettres, Paris, 2000) (573 pp.).
- Self-Deception: Stalin and the German Invasion of Russia (Hebrew translation, Ma'arachot, Tel Aviv, 1999) (450 pp.)
- Rokovoi samoobman. Stalin i napadenie Germanii na Sovetskii soiuz (Russian translation, Rospen, Moscow, 1999, reissued 2009)
- Die Täuschung: Stalin, Hitler und das “Unternehmen Barbarossa” (German translation, Siedler, Berlin, 2001) paperback edition, 2001)
- Documents on Israeli-Soviet Relations, 1941-1953 (2 vols.)(Cass, London, 2000) (998 pp.)
- with W. Weidenfeld, Regional Security in the Wake of the Collapse of the Soviet Union: Europe and the Middle East (Europa Union Verlag, Munich, 2002)
- Russia between East and West: Russian Foreign Policy on the Threshold of the 21st Century (Cass, London, 2003)
- Stafford Cripps in Moscow 1940-42, Diary and Papers (Valentine and Mitchel, 2007)
- The Maisky Diaries - Red Ambassador to the Court of St James's, 1932-1943 (Yale University Press, Oct 2015)
