= Valeri Danilov =

Russian military historian

Valeri Danilov (also spelled: Valeriy; Russian:Валерий Дмитриевич Данилов) is a Russian military historian and a retired officer (Colonel). Danilov has a Candidate of History Sciences degree (кандидат исторических наук) and is a professor at the Academy of Military Science in Moscow.

== Findings ==
In the early 1990s, Soviet and Russian archives were made newly accessible to researchers from Russian and other nations. They have found previously unknown documents that have prompted new interpretations of 20th century Russia and Soviet history.

As an example, in 1993, Yuri Gorkov and Valeri Danilov published the article, "Was Stalin Preparing a Preemptive Strike Against Hitler in 1941?" in Russian Studies in History, XXXVI, Nr.3, 1997/98, S. 22–46. It was based on their interpretation of a previously classified document, titled "Considerations to the plan of the strategic development of the armed forces of the Soviet Union" and dated May 15, 1941, which proposed a strike on Germany. The paper was purportedly composed by Georgy Zhukov, defense commissar, and Semyon Timoshenko, chief of staff, and presented to Joseph Stalin. The publication of this plan has generated much discussion among Russian historians (both in and outside Russia) about Stalin's intended strategy in 1941.

Gorkov and Danilov argued that, taking into account Stalin's control of Soviet life, it is highly unlikely that these two high-ranking men would have had such a document prepared without Stalin's explicit authorization. The 1937 purges had decimated the ranks of the higher officers. Danilov suggests that this draft by Zhukov was the basis for Soviet military planning in 1941, and that Stalin intended to strike Germany before the Nazis' Operation Barbarossa took place.

== Works ==
- Данилов Валерий Забывчивость или обман? О некоторых нестыковках в освещении преддверия Великой Отечественной войны (Online text)
- Валерий Данилов Сталин опоздал... - Родина, 1995, No.7, с. 70-73 Online text
