= Österreichische Militärische Zeitschrift =

- Discipline: Military
- Language: German

Publication details
- History: 1808–present
- Frequency: Bimonthly

Standard abbreviations
- ISO 4: Österr. Mil. Z.

Indexing
- ISSN: 0048-1440

Links
- Journal homepage

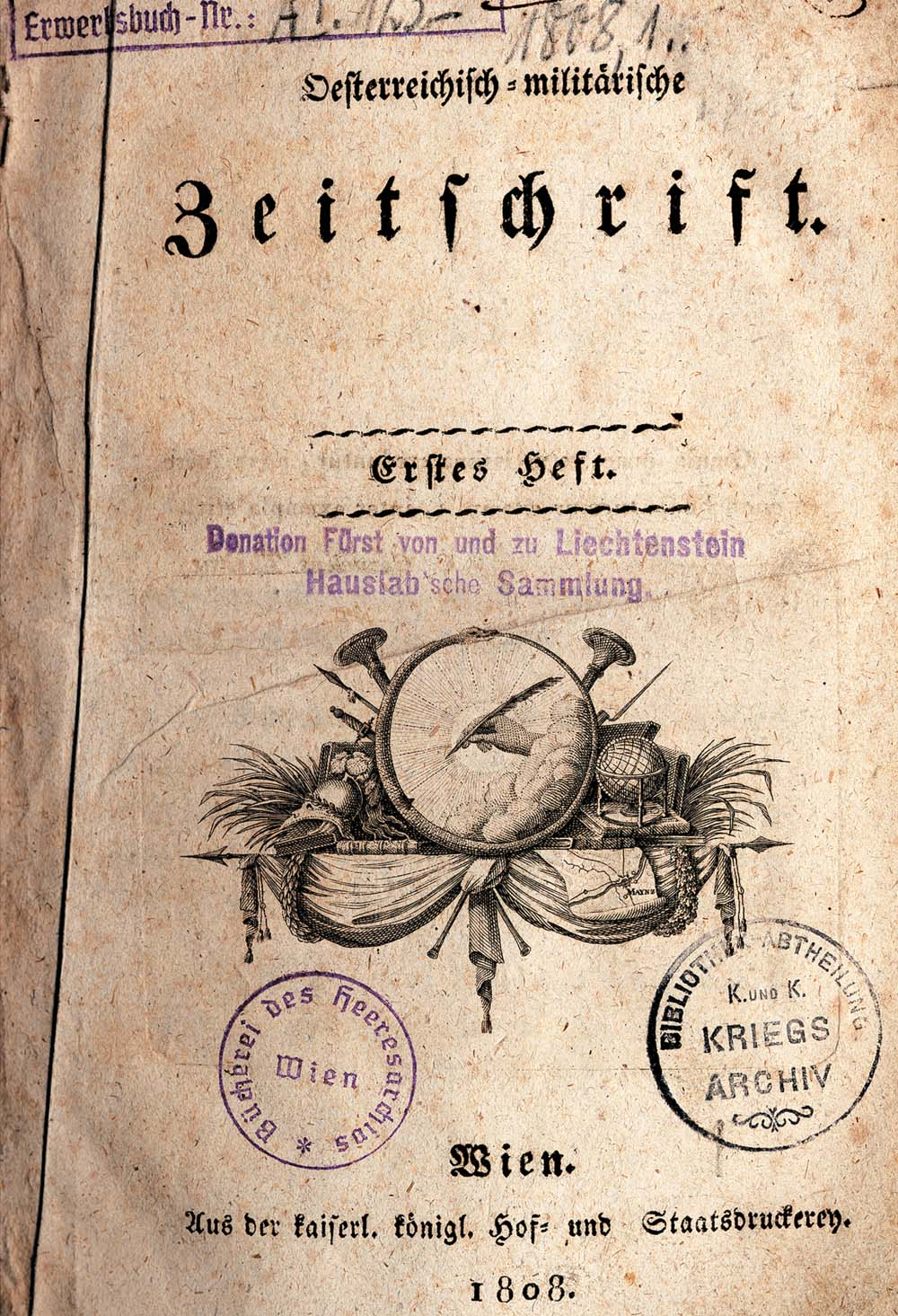
The first edition, 1808.

The Österreichische Militärische Zeitschrift (Austrian Military Journal, ISSN 0048-1440) is a bimonthly academic journal for defence matters, covering reports and analyses in the fields of security policy and military science. The journal was established in 1808 by Archduke Charles, Duke of Teschen. Moritz Gomez de Parientos (1744–1810) was the first editor-in-chief. The content is written in German. Some abstracts are available in French and English.
