= Aquarium (disambiguation) =

An aquarium is a clear-sided container in which water-dwelling plants and animals are kept.

Aquarium may also refer to:

== Buildings ==
- Public aquarium, a facility that houses living aquatic animal and plant specimens for public viewing
- The Headquarters of the Main Intelligence Directorate, colloquially known as the 'Aquarium'

== Arts and entertainment ==
=== Music ===
- Aquarium (band), a Russian rock group
- The Aquarium (band), an American indie rock band
  - The Aquarium (album), 2006
- Aquarium (Aqua album), 1997
- Aquarium, a 2014 album by Buckethead
- "Aquarium", the seventh movement of The Carnival of the Animals by Camille Saint-Saëns

=== Film and television ===
- The Aquarium (film), a 2008 Egyptian drama film
- Aquarium (film), a 2022 Malayalam film directed by T Deepesh
- Aquarium (TV series), a Canadian documentary series

=== Other uses in arts and entertainment ===
- Aquarium (manga), a 1990 one-shot shōjo manga by Tomoko Taniguchi
- Aquarium (Suvorov), a 1985 book by Viktor Surovov, and film and TV series
- Aquarium, a 2022 visual novel starring Minato Aqua
- Theme Aquarium, a 1998 video game also known as Aquarium

== Transportation ==
- Aquarium station (MBTA), Boston, Massachusetts, U.S.
- Aquarium station (River Line), Camden, New Jersey, U.S.
- Aquarium ferry wharf, Sydney, Australia

== See also ==
- Aquaria (disambiguation)
- Aquarius (disambiguation)
