= Aquarium station =

Aquarium station may refer to:

- Aquarium station (MBTA), Boston, Massachusetts, U.S.
- Aquarium station (River Line), Camden, New Jersey, U.S.

== See also ==
- Aquarium (disambiguation)
