= Headquarters of the Main Intelligence Directorate =

Armed Forces of the Russian Federation

- Штаб Главного разведывательного управления
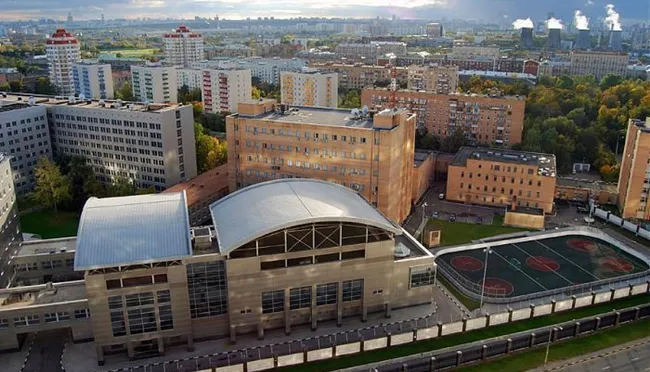
- View of the building from Ulitsa Grizodubovoy
- Interactive map of the Headquarters of the Main Intelligence Directorate area
- Alternative names: The Aquarium

General information
- Location: Ulitsa Grizodubovoy 3, Khoroshevskoye, 101000, Moscow, Russian Federation
- Coordinates: 55.782284°N 37.524455°E
- Current tenants: Main Intelligence Directorate (GRU)
- Renovated: 2006
- Cost: ₽9.5 billion

Other information
- Public transit: Polezhayevskaya

The Headquarters of the Main Intelligence Directorate, commonly known as the Aquarium, is the headquarters of the Main Directorate of the General Staff of the Armed Forces of the Russian Federation, and is located at Khodynka Field, the site of Moscow's first airport.

The building was extensively renovated in the early 2000s.

== Name ==
The site's colloquial name of the 'Aquarium' is supposedly a wordplay on the GRU's ability to see what is happening in the world from inside the building, and was first introduced into popular usage by GRU defector Viktor Suvorov's 1985 semi-autobiographical book on the workings of the GRU, Aquarium.

"For the basis of this unusual name, as we can assume, he [Suvorov] took, first, the appearance of the main building of the directorate made of glass and concrete, and, second, attempted to emphasize that everything that is happening in the world can be seen from it."

== Gallery ==
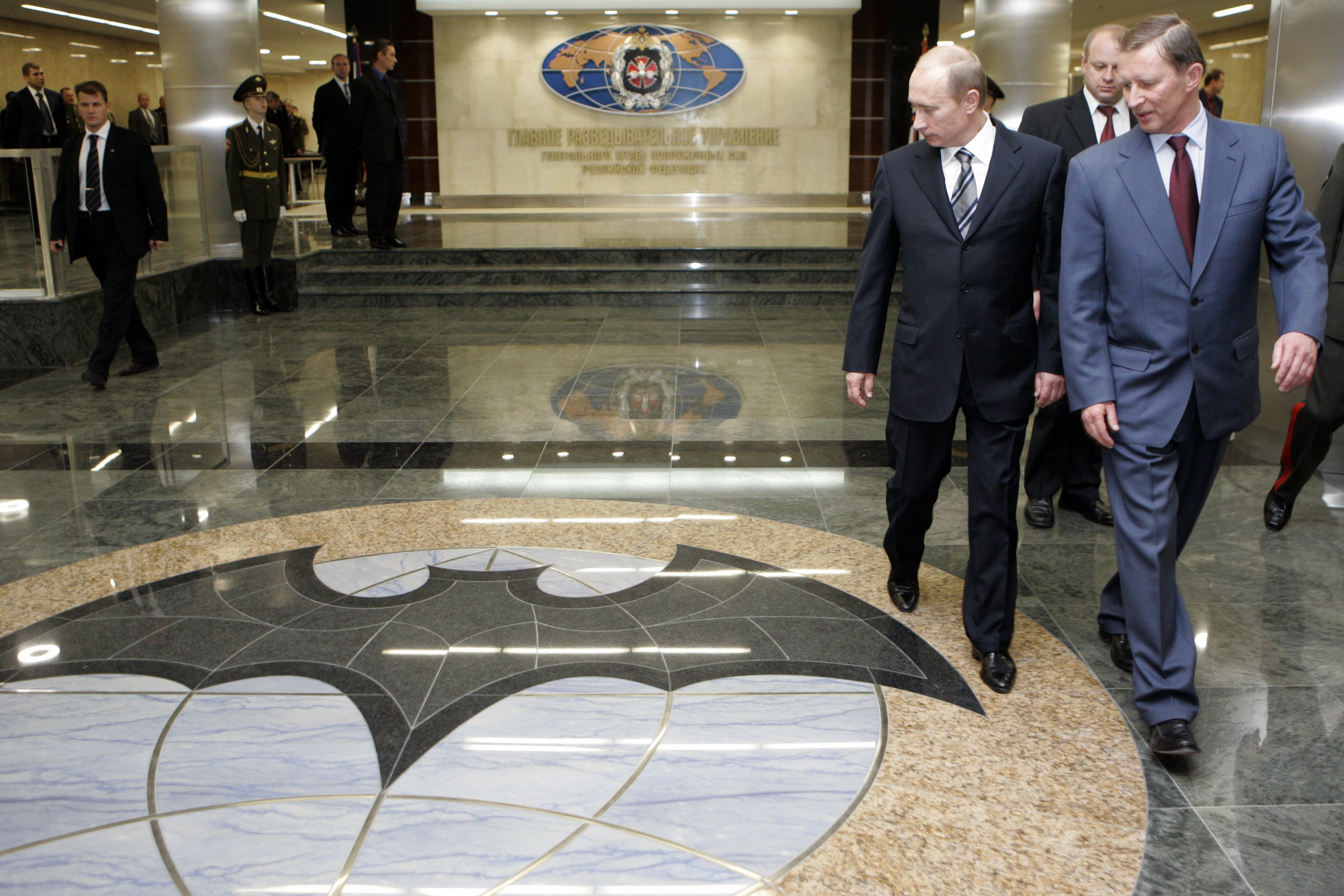
Russian president Vladimir Putin in the building's lobby in 2006

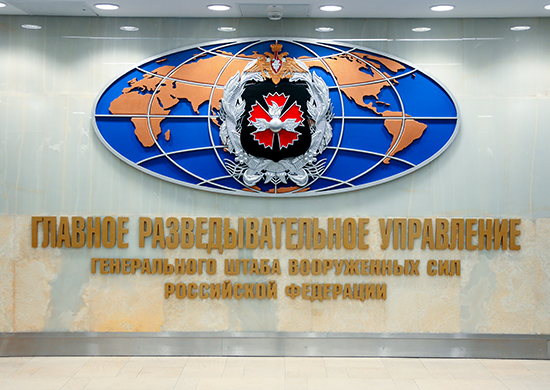
Emblem in the Main Intelligence Directorate of the General Staff of the Armed Forces

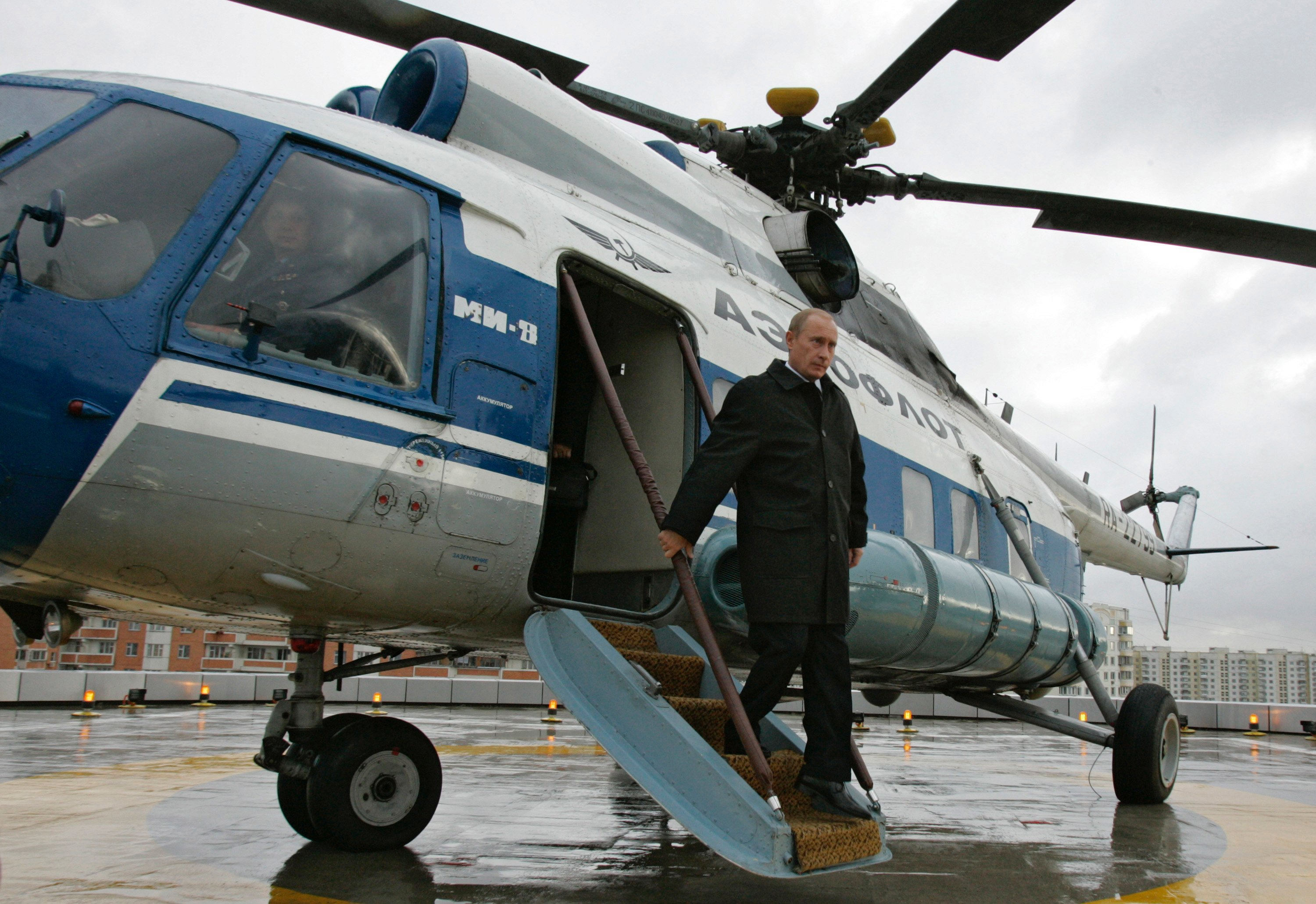
Vladimir Putin exits his helicopter on the roof of the GRU headquarters

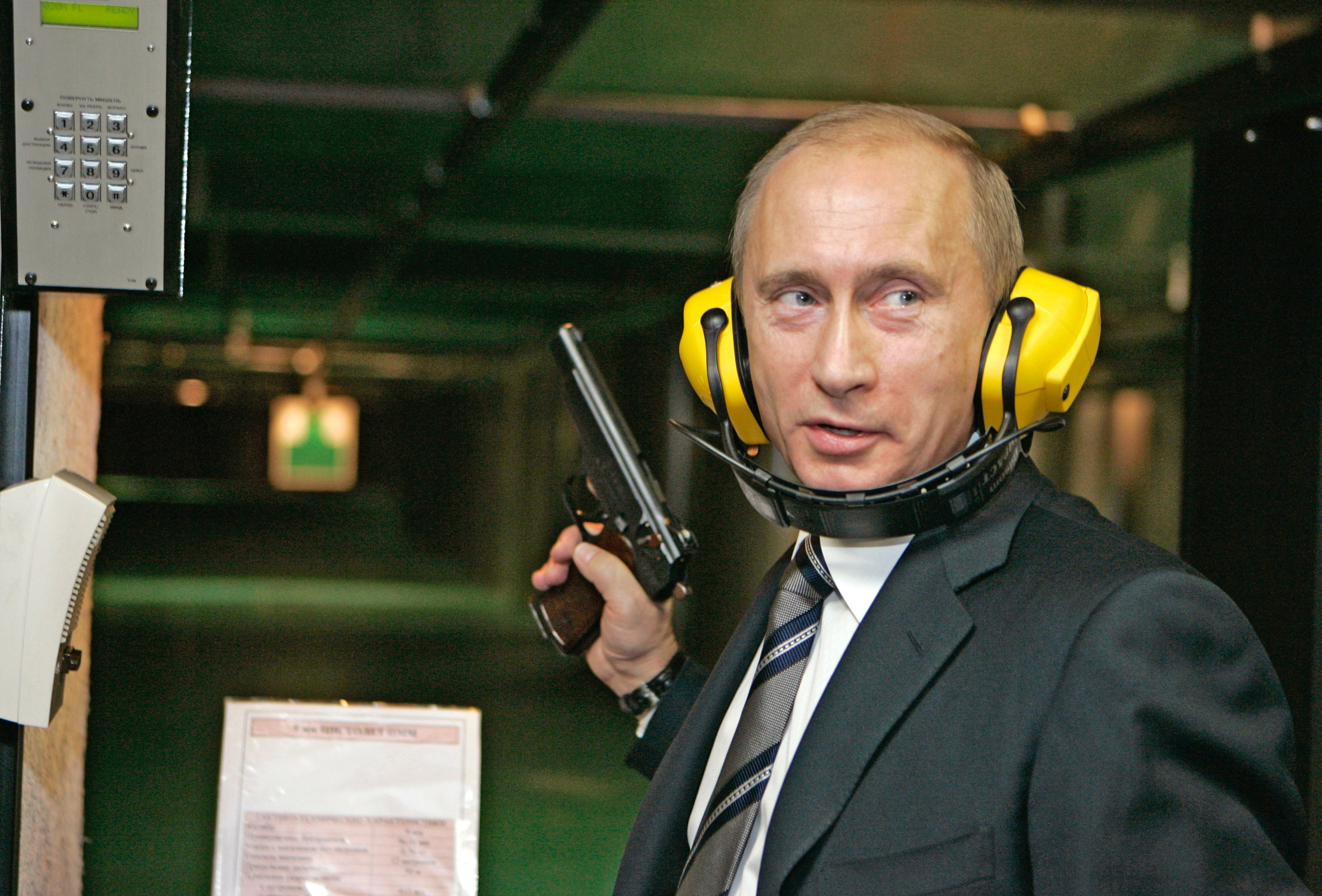
Vladimir Putin uses a shooting range inside the GRU headquarters during a 2006 visit
