= Call Me Princess =

Japanese manga

姫ってよんでねっ (Hime tte yonde ne!)
- Genre: Romance
- Manga
- Written by: Tomoko Taniguchi
- Published by: Jitsugyo no Nihon Sha
- English publisher: NA: CPM Press
- Magazine: My Birthday
- Original run: 1992 – 1993
- Volumes: 1

Call Me Princess (姫ってよんでねっ, Hime tte yonde ne!) is a one volume shōjo manga by Tomoko Taniguchi (たにぐち智子).

== Plot ==
The story revolves around a teenage girl called Mako who dreams of being called a Princess by her "Prince Charming". She idolizes her brother-in-law and wants a husband just like him to call her Princess, as he calls her sister. Things get complicated when her brother-in-law's brother, Ryu, moves in with Mako's family in order to finish his last year at high school.
