= Tomoko Taniguchi =

Japanese shōjo manga artist

Tomoko Taniguchi たにぐち智子
- Born: Hokkaidō, Japan
- Occupation: Manga artist

Tomoko Taniguchi (たにぐち智子, Taniguchi Tomoko) is a Japanese shōjo manga artist who was born in Hokkaidō, then spent a year in college at the University of Michigan in Ann Arbor.

Taniguchi's manga have been published by MB (My Birthday) in Japanese and by CPM Manga in English. She has published 9 volumes of manga total. Her first published manga was Anpan Balance, which won silver at the 4th Omacomi Manga School Contest. Anpan Balance was later released in the manga Let's Stay Together Forever; the title story of that book was her second published story.

Taniguchi and Matt Forbeck have helped write some of the books in the Complete Idiot's Guide to Drawing Manga Illustrated series, especially the Shoujo edition which includes her illustrations.

Taniguchi recently designed her first fabric print for American clothing designer Samantha Rei.

- The first shōjo manga artist for Marvel Comic. ( Marvel AI #1 )
- As her biggest dream, drawing Star Wars as Shoujo manga style, she became one of the Sketch Card artists for Topps Star Wars trading cards.

== Partial bibliography ==
(dates are given: 1st date, Japanese Release, 2nd date, English release)

- Let's Stay Together Forever (1989) (2003): Tomoko Taniguchi's first published tankouban, published one year after her initial debut. She aimed the work at girls in their early teens or younger, and it is based loosely on memories from her own childhood. Let's Stay Together Forever is a collection of one-chapter stories about metal heads and the shy girls who they have relationships with.
- Aquarium (?) (2000): Aquarium is composed of two short stories, one about a shy girl who loves going to the aquarium and the other about a flight attendant.
- Call Me Princess (?) (1999)
- Princess Prince (?) (2003)
- Popcorn Romance (1992) (2003)
- Just a Girl (2 Volumes) (?) (2004)
- Miss Me? (1991) (2003)
- Spellbound: The Magic of Love (2001)
- Marvel AI #1 (2006)
- The Complete Idiot's Guide to Manga Fantasy Creatures Illustrated (2007)
- The Complete Idiot's Guide to Drawing Manga Shoujo Illustrated (2008)
- Sketch card artist for Star Wars Galaxy 5, 6, Empire Strikes Back 3D, Star Wars Galactic files 1 & 2, RETURN OF THE JEDI 3D、and more ....
