= Suicide (Suvorov book) =

- Author: Viktor Suvorov
- Original title: Самоубийство
- Language: Russian
- Subject: Soviet Union history; military history
- Publisher: AST
- Publication date: 2001 (latest version)
- Publication place: Russia
- Pages: 380 (softcover)
- ISBN: 978-5-17-007812-7

Suicide is a book by Viktor Suvorov about German preparations for the war with the Soviet Union. Suvorov argues that the German army was ill-prepared, Germany's leaders were unsophisticated (if not foolish), and that attacking Russia was suicidal for Germany (hence the title of the book), and he suggests an explanation why Adolf Hitler nevertheless did what he did. Suvorov compares the German and Soviet armies and concludes that the latter had superiority of almost every kind. Suvorov points to German lack of gasoline in Summer 1941 and the lack of strategic bombers which would have been necessary to destroy Soviet military industry beyond the Urals even if the initial Blitzkrieg plan had succeeded. He also criticizes Soviet-era historiography and answers some of the criticism raised against his views.

== The book ==
- Suicide. For what reason Hitler attacked the Soviet Union? (Самоубийство), Moscow, ACT, 2000, ISBN 5-17-003119-X
