= North–South Rail Link =

Proposed rail tunnel connecting Boston's North and South Stations

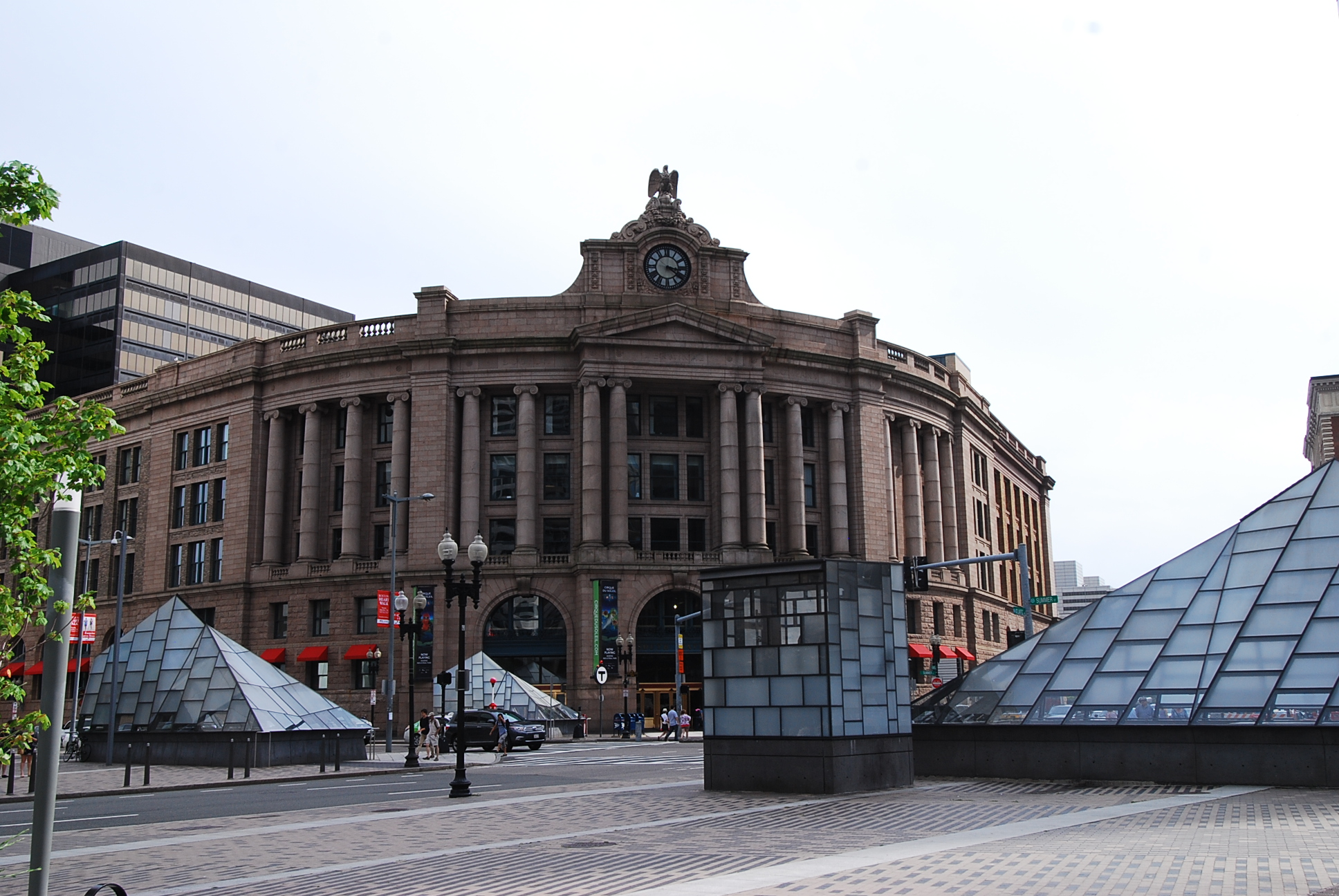
- South Station in Boston in August 2012

Overview
- Status: Proposed
- Owner: MBTA
- Locale: Boston, Massachusetts, U.S.
- Termini: South Station; North Station
- Stations: 2 or 3 proposed

Service
- Type: Commuter Rail
- Operator: MBTA

Technical
- Line length: 5 miles (8.0 km)
- Number of tracks: 2 or 4
- Track gauge: 4 ft 8 1/2 in (1,435 mm) standard gauge
- Electrification: Yes

The North–South Rail Link would close a 1.5-mile (2.4 km) gap at the center of the regional rail network.

The North–South Rail Link (NSRL) is a proposed rail tunnel, or pair of tunnels, that would connect North Station and South Station in downtown Boston, Massachusetts, linking rail networks that serve the city's northern suburbs, New Hampshire, and Maine with the rest of the country. The project would build new underground stations near the existing stations, connect them with about 1.5 miles (2.4 km) of tunnels, and add other tunnels to link up with existing surface tracks.

The NSRL would connect Amtrak and MBTA Commuter Rail lines that terminate either at North or South Station. For MBTA, it would link northern lines to South Station, Back Bay Station, and lines beyond Back Bay, including the Framingham/Worcester Line and the Northeast Corridor; one option under consideration would also link to commuter lines to the south. The project would also link Amtrak's various trains into and out of the city; for example, the Downeaster line from Maine currently has no direct connection with Northeast Corridor trains to New York City and beyond.

In 2017, a Harvard Kennedy School study estimated the cost of the NSRL at $4 to $6 billion (in 2025 dollars), based on Federal Transit Administration data and an analysis of comparable tunnel projects around the world. A 2018 MassDOT study looked at four options with estimated costs ranging from $12 billion to $22 billion (in 2028 dollars).

As of 2026, the North-South Rail Link has not been pursued and is not in active development, though advocates call for updated studies.

== Historical connections ==
From 1872 to 1969, the freight-only Union Freight Railroad provided a direct, street running connection between most of the south-side and north-side railroads, and served local customers and wharves in between.

From 1901 to 1938, the Atlantic Avenue Elevated, run by the Boston Elevated Railway, provided direct passenger service past North and South Stations. The elevated trackage was not connected to any of the conventional railroad tracks.

The Grand Junction Railroad, specifically its western segment, remains as the only rail connection between the north and south railroads in the Boston area.

== Present connections ==
MBTA commuter rail map as of 2018 showing separation of northern and southern segments. Amtrak's Downeaster to Maine terminates at North Station; all other Amtrak trains terminate at South Station.

Public transit connects North Station to South Station only indirectly, through two of the MBTA Subway system's quartet of hub stations. A trip between the two commuter rail stations requires taking two subway lines – either the Green Line and the Red Line through their shared Park Street station, or the Orange Line and the Red Line via their shared Downtown Crossing station. It can also be done by walking between the two stations, which takes between 20 and 30 minutes. Amtrak recommends that passengers with young children or much luggage take a taxi or rideshare between the stations.

It is possible to traverse the gap directly via the Orange Line from Back Bay Station to North Station, but it requires seven stops and only four of the southern lines pass through Back Bay. The Orange Line also provides a connection for Amtrak passengers who want to transfer between the Northeast Corridor and the Downeaster. However, North Station passengers add to Orange Line congestion. Similarly, it is possible to connect between South Station and the Fitchburg Line via the Red Line at Porter station. Passengers on the Newburyport/Rockport Line can also take the Silver Line from Chelsea (Bellingham Square). MBTA bus route 4 connects the two stations, albeit only at weekday peak hours.

The North–South Rail Link is proposed to fill all these gaps in service, with direct connections requiring no transfers.

== 2018 NSRL feasibility study ==
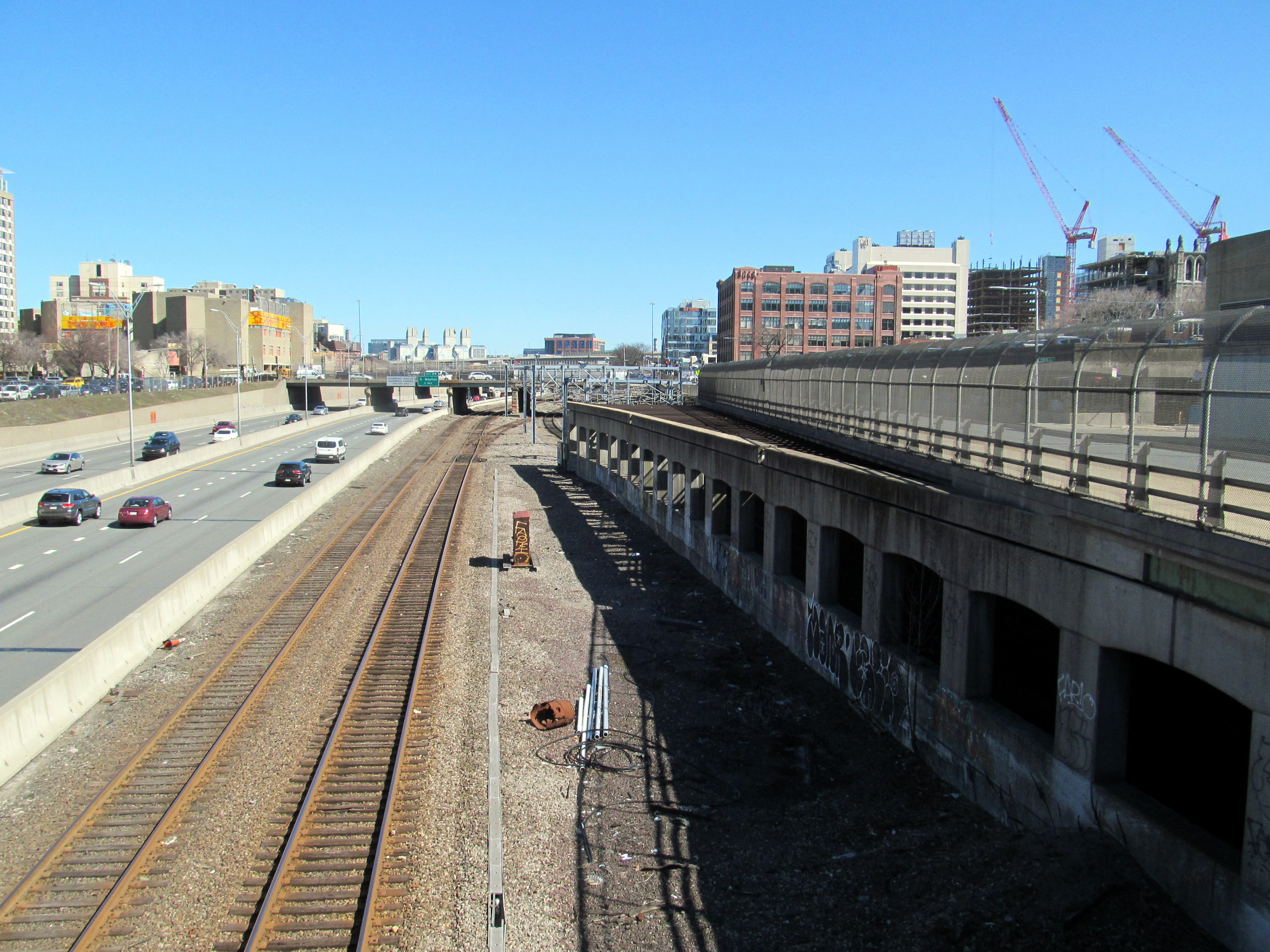
The Back Bay portal, serving the Northeast Corridor and Worcester Line, would be located in this area east of Tremont Street

In June 2018, MassDOT released a North South Rail Link Feasibility Reassessment presentation that described several tunnel alternatives. The state began soliciting bids for a $2 million feasibility study on March 1, 2017. This study had been pushed for by the North-South Rail Link Working Group. The working group, NSRL supporters, includes Senator Ed Markey, Representatives Niki Tsongas and Katherine Clark, with Representative Seth Moulton leading the effort. It also includes more than half of Massachusetts mayors.

=== Options ===
The 2018 MassDOT feasibility study analyzed four options. The costs, presented in 2028 dollars, include purchasing additional rolling stock, other required infrastructure improvements, and a 3.5% annual inflation. Presenters noted that a planned expansion of South Station would cost an estimated $4.7 billion, not including the purchase of rolling stock, electrifying the system, and renovating Tower 1.

Two options would run under the Central Artery (I-93), one option with two tracks and the other, more expensive, with four. The other two options, each with two tracks, would tunnel under downtown Boston several blocks west of the Artery. All the proposals connect the northern commuter rail lines with South Station and then to Back Bay and lines to the west. Only the four-track option would connect North Station with the Fairmount Line south of South Station. Under all the proposals, lines using the Old Colony main line (the Greenbush, Kingston, and Fall River/New Bedford lines) would continue to terminate at the South Station surface platforms. The existing North Station and its surface platforms could be eliminated under all four options, making the area available for redevelopment.

==== Central Artery four-track ====
The most ambitious option is the only one that includes a new Central station (or Union Station) near its midpoint, and the only one with a rail tunnel connection to the Fairmount Line. North Station would be underground near the present station. The line would be constructed using two 41 foot (12 m) TBM tunnels, 125 feet (38 m) deep, along with cut-and-cover in Fort Point Channel. Underground South Station would be built in Fort Point Channel, east of the surface station. Central station would connect to the Blue Line at Aquarium station. The Blue Line is currently the only MBTA rapid transit line with no direct connection to the commuter rail network. Estimated cost: $21.491 billion.

==== Central Artery two-track ====
Same route as Central Artery four-track but has no Central station. Constructed using one 41 foot (12 m) TBM tunnel, 125 feet (38 m) deep, with cut-and-cover used in Fort Point Channel. Underground South Station would be built in Fort Point Channel, east of surface station. Estimated cost: $12.317 billion.

==== South/Congress alignment ====
North Station would be entirely underground and moved several blocks south, to between State and Haymarket Streets; no Central station. Stacked tracks and platforms are incorporated within a single 51 foot (16 m) TBM bored tunnel, 115–130 feet (35–40 m) deep. Underground South Station would be north-west of surface station. Estimated cost: $13.181 billion.

==== Pearl/Congress alignment ====
North Station would be entirely underground and moved several blocks south, to between State and Haymarket Streets; no Central station. Tracks would be in two 29 foot (8.8 m) TBM bored tunnels, 135–195 feet (41–59 m) deep. Underground South Station would be north of surface station. Estimated cost: $14.388 billion.

=== Electrification ===
The tunnels would not be able to handle diesel locomotives and therefore would require the use of dual-mode locomotives or the electrification of several MBTA commuter rail lines. Full electrification of additional rail lines, proposed in earlier studies, could help Massachusetts and the MBTA reach their greenhouse-gas reduction goals, make service more reliable, allow trains to accelerate more quickly, and reduce travel times, but it is expensive and only limited electrification is included in the 2018 proposals. Part of the Fairmount Line would be electrified to allow Amtrak and MBTA Northeast Corridor trains currently routed through Back Bay to reach South Station during construction of the Back Bay portal. The electrified service region would also incorporate the proposed South Coast Rail project's Phase II, which includes electrification to Fall River and New Bedford.

=== Benefits ===
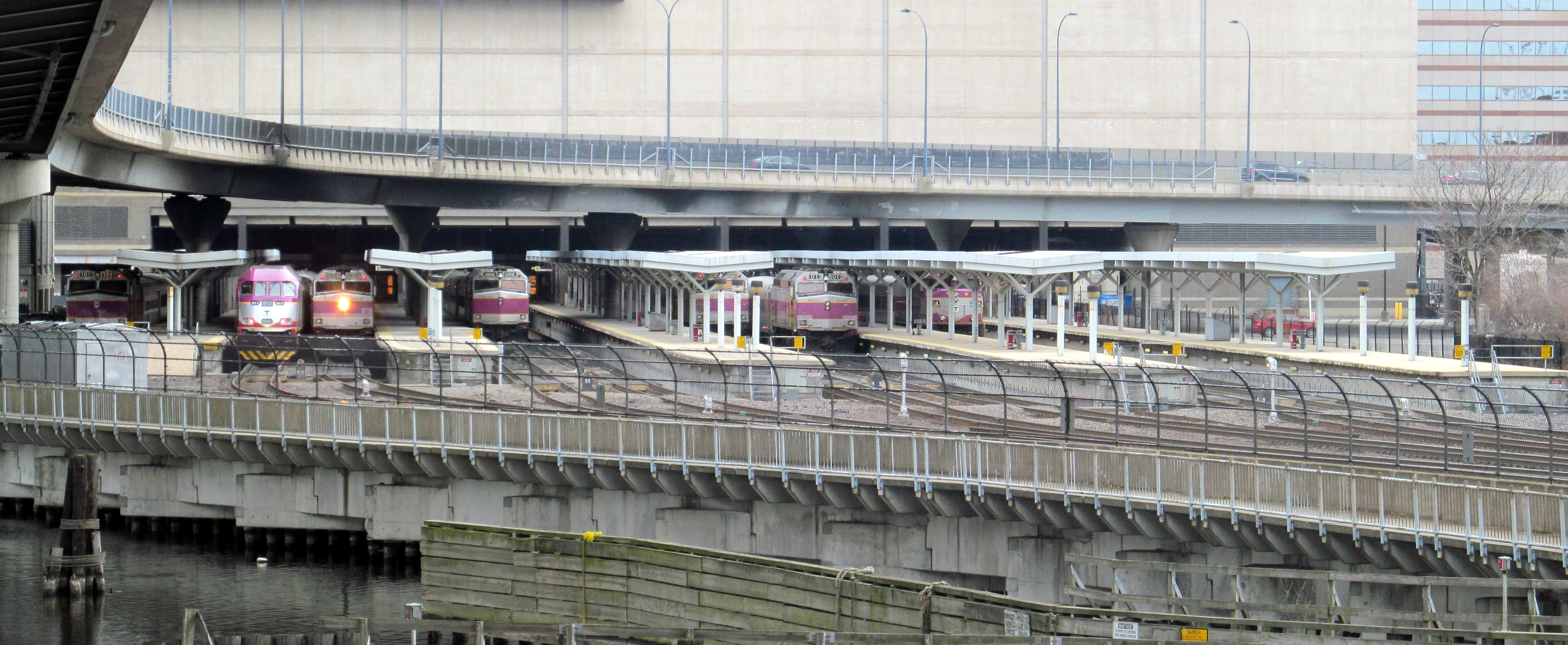
North Station platforms

The 2018 feasibility study modeled ridership in 2040 based on various scenarios. In regular service, the two-track options would increase all day boardings to 195,000 compared with 150,000 in the no-build scenario. Assuming an upgrade to all-day peak service, the two-track options would increase all day boardings to 225,000 compared with 195,000 with the South Station expansion. Overall, NSRL would increase commuter rail capacity, in terms of seats to downtown, by 25%.

The feasibility study presentation also projected the distribution of destinations for commuters coming from the north in the morning.

NSRL Projected Morning Trips From The North in 2040, Two-Track
Destination	Passengers	Percent
North Station	18,182	67%
South Station	5,477	20.2%
Back Bay	2,712	10%
Through service	771	2.8%
Total	27,142	100%

=== Potential issues ===
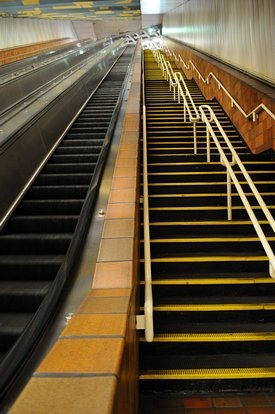
Porter Square escalators

The 2018 feasibility study identified several potential problems and risks with the NSRL project. During construction of the Back Bay tunnel portal, required under all options, the MBTA Worcester Line and Amtrak Lake Shore Limited service would have to terminate west of Back Bay station or possibly be rerouted via the Grand Junction Line into North Station. Also some or all Amtrak, Providence, Stoughton, and Franklin Line service would be rerouted via the Fairmount Line into South Station.

The proposal makes aggressive assumptions about improved passenger loading and unloading times and on how many trains can operate per hour in the tunnels. The proposed train frequency, 17 per hour per direction in the two-track options, is higher than the current Red Line train frequency, and exceeds what has been achieved to date on other systems that use the new positive train control systems required for heavy rail. To maintain the 17 trains/hour frequency, trains would have to arrive to enter the tunnel precisely as scheduled. However, new systems like Thameslink in London, UK, have shown that up to 24 trains per hour are possible on heavy rail.

With the NSRL, the MBTA commuter rail system would be highly dependent on the tunnel routes. Any disruption to those routes would affect the entire system.While the NSRL design as proposed exceeds National Fire Protection Association NFPA 130 life safety requirements, evacuation of the deep tunnels and stations in case of fire could still be difficult. The deep stations would also cost passengers additional time entering and leaving. Currently Porter Square station, at 105 ft, is the deepest in the MBTA system.

== Early proposals ==
There have been several proposals to link South Station and North Station by rail. In 1987, Congress included funding for the link in a highway and transit bill, but it was dropped after Ronald Reagan vetoed the bill.

A North-South Rail Link was included in the original Big Dig design, but was dropped by the Dukakis Administration. An earlier leading proposal, called the "Dorchester Avenue Alignment", is similar to the four-track Central Artery alignment in the 2018 study. It would dig two 41-foot-diameter (12 m) deep-bore tunnels beneath Boston, extending beyond the present rail yards north and south of the city. The tunnels would pass about 20 feet (6.1 m) beneath the I-90 extension, and would reach their maximum depth of 130 feet (40 m) at a possible Central Station and at North Station. Carrying a total of up to four tracks, the tunnels would have steep inclines. Trains entering or exiting the tunnels would climb or descend 3% grades, each nearly 1 mile (1.6 km) long.

Because the tunnels would continue well south of downtown, three portals would accommodate separate connections to Back Bay station to the west; the Old Colony main line to the south, and the Fairmount Line running southwest. To the north, the tunnels would cross the Charles River about 70 feet (21 m) below its surface (bypassing an existing drawbridge), and connect via portals to the Fitchburg Line and the other northbound rail lines. The plan would require two or three new underground stations; stations are proposed roughly beneath the current North and South Stations, and possibly a new Central Station near Aquarium Station. Central Station would have an 800-foot (240 m) platform; North Station and South Station would have 1,050-foot (320 m) platforms.

Pilings for a South Station Tower at South Station complicate a proposal to put the tunnels directly beneath the present South Station. Instead, the Dorchester Avenue Alignment proposal would move the tracks just east of South Station, and would build an underground facility about 100 feet (30 m) below the surface of the Fort Point Channel at the Summer Street crossing. Tracks at the underground South Station would have a 0.61% incline.

The new Central Station would connect with the Blue Line at its Aquarium station via an underground concourse, as the Blue Line is the only rapid transit line in Boston that does not already connect with either North or South Station. The new station also would eliminate or reduce transfers to the rapid transit system for many commuter rail passengers with destinations in the central part of the business district. This would relieve transit congestion in the downtown core. Like Philadelphia's SEPTA system after the similar Center City Commuter Connection tunnel was built and connected two commuter rail systems, some of Boston's trains would be through-routed from one side of the system to the other. Many services would still terminate at North and South Stations, on existing tracks that do not lead into the tunnels. This could also allow trains to pass parked train cars.

A 2003 DEIR/MIS assumes that about one-third of Amtrak trains to and from points south would be routed through the tunnel, stopping only at South Station, but with a new stop north of Boston at Anderson Regional Transportation Center in Woburn, Massachusetts. The Downeaster service from Maine and New Hampshire was assumed to stop at North Station only, with a direct connection to more southerly service at Anderson RTC rather than Boston. Thus, some operations would continue above ground at North Station and South Station, and all track and facilities would remain in place. The tunnels would not be equipped to handle diesel locomotives, which may not be suited to the planned steep grades and closely spaced stops; several Commuter Rail lines would necessitate electrification to safely and efficiently operate in the tunnels.

== Route map ==
The map below depicts one of the most extensive proposals made to date. The 2018 feasibility study options do not include a link to the Old Colony and Greenbush lines. Only the four-track option includes a link to the Fairmont Line and a Central station. The surface North Station would be eliminated in two of the options and might not be kept in the other two.

Route map of the North–South Rail Link (Central Artery Four-track Alignment)

== Status ==
In May 2006, the Commonwealth of Massachusetts withdrew its sponsorship of the project due to its high capital cost, which was projected at several billion dollars. Without matching local funds, the project was ineligible for federal funding, and was no longer listed as an approved project in state and Boston MPO capital plans. The April 2007 document Journey to 2030: Transportation Plan of the Boston Region Metropolitan Planning Organization said "the MPO feels that a study of the right-of-way requirements should be conducted for preservation of that right-of-way so as to not preclude this project's going forward in the future."

In December 2007, the Federal Railroad Administration was interested in funding this project if the Massachusetts Executive Office of Transportation was interested in sponsoring it. In August 2009, the project was brought back into the spotlight as a component of the New England transportation plan, a coordinated effort by the six New England states to improve rail transportation infrastructure by competing for the $8 billion allocated for high-speed rail in the American Recovery and Reinvestment Act of 2009.

In December 2011, former Governor Michael Dukakis reiterated his long-term support for rail service, saying he had been trying to convince the current Massachusetts administration "to get serious about building a rail link" rather than expand South Station. In January 2014, Dukakis said he would prefer to have the North–South Rail Link named after him, rather than South Station, as the Massachusetts House of Representatives had voted unanimously to do. In August 2015, former Governors Dukakis and William F. Weld co-wrote an op-ed calling the link "One of the most important and cost-effective investments we can make". Based on their advocacy, MassDOT agreed to fund a $2 million study in February 2016.

In June 2018, MassDOT released a North South Rail Link Feasibility Reassessment presentation that proposed several tunnel alternatives, described above. The state began soliciting bids for the $2 million feasibility study, advocated for by the North-South Rail Link Working Group, in March 2017. The study did not identify a funding source for constructing the NSRL. On September 6, 2018, MassDOT released their draft feasibility reassessment report and asked for public comment by October 19.

== Alternatives ==
As of 2018, the MBTA and Amtrak use the Grand Junction Line for non-revenue vehicle moves between the two sides of their networks. This alternative connection splits from the Framingham/Worcester Line near Boston University and the Mass Turnpike Allston/Brighton exit ramps, and the track then crosses the Charles River into Cambridge. From there, it runs through the East Cambridge neighborhood and into Somerville, where it connects to the commuter rail lines running from North Station, just below the McGrath-O'Brien Highway.

The line is currently single-tracked east of Massachusetts Avenue and slow, with a large number of at-grade crossings. Several of the crossings (e.g. Massachusetts Avenue, several streets around Kendall Square, Cambridge Street, and Gore Street) require trains to come to a near-complete stop before proceeding at their maximum allowed track speed of 10 miles per hour (16 km/h). The line would potentially be served by a new West Station which is proposed as part of the Beacon Park Yard redevelopment.

The Grand Junction corridor has also been proposed as part of the Urban Ring light rail or bus rapid transit project, or a possible pedestrian trail. However, only Worcester Line trains would be directly served, while all other trains from South Station lines would have to detour and reverse all the way to the west of Back Bay and Lansdowne stations to reach the Grand Junction connection.

== See also ==
- Center City Commuter Connection, a similar project in Philadelphia
- Regional Connector, a similar project in Los Angeles
