= The Aquarium (album) =

Studio album by The Aquarium
- Released: 2006
- Recorded: June 2005
- Genre: Indie rock
- Length: 34:20
- Label: Dischord Records

Professional ratings
Review scores
Source	Rating
AllMusic	3.5/5 stars
Pitchfork Media	(7.6/10)
PopMatters	(8/10)

The Aquarium is an album by The Aquarium, released in 2006 on the Dischord record label.

== Track listing ==
1. "Maxxo Sesh" – 3:26
2. "Can't Afford to Live Here" – 3:39
3. "Waiting for the Girl" – 3:07
4. "Credits" – 3:56
5. "Good People" – 5:19
6. "Channel 9" – 1:44
7. "White House" – 2:13
8. "Golden Pyramid" – 1:19
9. "Through the Tunnel" – 2:22
10. "Slow Space" – 3:25
11. "Aquarium Dream" – 3:50

== Personnel ==
- Jason Hutto – electric piano, keyboard, vocals
- Laura Harris – drums
- Brendan Canty - Mixing
- Album was recorded by Jason Caddell/Inner Ear Studios.
- Mastering by TJ Lipple at Silver Sonya.
