= Aquarium (manga) =

Manga by Tomoko Taniguchi

アクエリアム (Akueriamu)
- Manga
- Written by: Tomoko Taniguchi
- Published by: Jitsugyo no Nihon Sha
- English publisher: NA: Central Park Media
- Magazine: My Birthday
- Published: 1990
- Volumes: 1

Aquarium (Japanese: アクエリアム, Hepburn: Akueriamu) is a one-shot shōjo manga by Tomoko Taniguchi. A series was produced in Jitsugyo no Nihon Sha's manga magazine, My Birthday, in 1990. Jitsugyo no Nihon Sha released the manga in September 1990. It was licensed in North America by Central Park Media, which was released in 2000. The manga was republished on April 1, 2008.
