= The Aquarium (band) =

American indie rock duo (2002–2006)

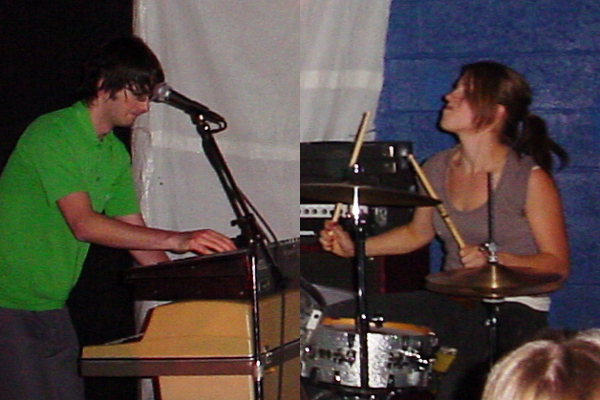
- The Aquarium (Laura Harris, right, Jason Hutto, left)

Background information
- Origin: Washington, D.C.
- Genres: Indie rock
- Years active: 2002–2006
- Label: Dischord Records
- Members: Jason Hutto; Laura Harris
- Website: http://aquariummusic.com

The Aquarium is an indie rock band from Washington, D.C., United States. The band was a duo consisting of Jason Hutto, formerly of Motor-Cycle Wars (electric piano, keyboard, vocals) and Laura Harris (drums), who later joined Ex Hex and has toured as a member of Death Valley Girls . The group was founded in 2002. Their music has been described as "catchy, vibrant, and slightly trippy".

The band's debut LP was released on the Dischord record label in October 2006.

== Discography ==
- The Aquarium (2006) (LP)
- Performer (2009) (EP)
