= Aquaria =

Aquaria is the plural of aquarium.

Aquaria may also refer to:

- Aquaria KLCC, an oceanarium in Kuala Lumpur, Malaysia
- Aquaria (video game), released in 2007
- Aquaria (drag queen), stage name of Giovanni Palandrani
- Aquaria (Boots album), a 2015 album by Boots
- Aquaria (Doda album), a 2022 album by Doda

== See also ==
- List of aquaria
