= Inside the Soviet Army =

1982 book by Viktor Suvorov

- Author: Viktor Suvorov
- Publication date: 1982

Inside the Soviet Army (ISBN 0-241-10889-6; Hamish Hamilton, 1982; also published in the United States, Prentice Hall, ISBN 0-02-615500-1) is a book by Viktor Suvorov (published under his pseudonym), which describes the general organisation, doctrine, and strategy of the Soviet armed forces (the term "Army" being used to cover not only the land force, but also strategic rocket, air defence, air, and naval forces). United States military reviewers described this book as one of the most important in its field published in the previous decade.

Suvorov was a veteran of the Soviet armed forces and military intelligence. He had defected to the United Kingdom in 1978 and published his first book there in 1981. All of his books have first been published in Russian; several have been translated into English, as these first two were.

== Description ==
Suvorov, a Russian-Ukrainian who was a former veteran and intelligence agent in the Soviet Union before defecting to the United Kingdom in 1978, explains his view on Soviet political realities. He portrays the military as an institution in which everything is subordinated to maintaining the communist regime's dominance, thus explaining the rationale behind Soviet strategic planning. Marxism is treated as a science to govern military strategy as well. He notes that at the time, three forces were always at work with the military: the Party, through the Politburo; the KGB; and the Soviet Army officers and hierarchy.

He describes the organisation of the Soviet Armed Forces, from the top down, focusing on the Soviet Ground Forces (the "Soviet Army"). Technical details are presented when they are useful, but he is primarily concerned with explaining the underlying philosophy and culture. He often contrasts these with the Western military approach.

Suvorov concludes with descriptions of the daily life inside the Soviet Army for the soldier and the officer, including the bullying and the hazing known as dedovshchina. This was almost unknown in the West when he published his book. It continues to be notorious in the Russian Ground Forces of the post-Soviet period, contributing to poor morale.

First published in Russian, this book was translated into English and published in editions in the UK and US.

== Critical reception ==
In "An Insider's Warning to the West", published in 1983, Lt. Col. Gregory Varhall and Major Kenneth M. Currie note that in this second book, Suvorov "regards the Soviet military as a formidable adversary despite its shortcomings." They describe this book as one of the most important in its field published in the previous decade (1970s-to early 1980s), and say that it gave the "first comprehensive look inside the Soviet military since The Penkovsky Papers." (These were published in 1965, a compilation of material smuggled by the late Soviet agent Oleg Penkovsky, who was executed in 1963 in the USSR for espionage.)

The reviewers note that Suvorov emphasizes how different the "experiential and cognitive basis" is for Soviet actions, compared to those of the US. He claimed the Soviets learned about US character by watching films of the Western genre.

Allan Weeks noted in footnote #16 to his article, "The Soviet View Toward Prognostication" (1983), that Suvorov had emphasized in this second book, in Part 5: "Strategy and Tactics," that the Soviets' offensive strategy was directed at using what they believed to be their superior prediction skills to catch the US and other Western nations off guard. Suvorov noted their success in the surprise invasion of Czechoslovakia in 1968, and said that there was a Chief Directorate for Strategic Camouflage.
