= Aquarium (TV series) =

- Presented by: Murray Newman; Bob Switzer
- Country of origin: Canada
- Original language: English
- No. of seasons: 1

Production
- Producer: Gordon Glynn
- Running time: 30 minutes

Original release
- Network: CBC Television
- Release: 5 July – 20 September 1974

Aquarium is a Canadian nature documentary television series that aired on CBC Television in 1974 and rebroadcast in 1975.

== Premise ==
This nature series was recorded at various locations, including the Vancouver Aquarium. It was hosted by Murray Newman, a curator, and Bob Switzer. The focus was on aquatic life, often following Newman's excursions to Australia and the South Pacific, as well as expeditions along Vancouver Island and Vancouver's harbour.

== Scheduling ==
The series aired on Fridays 5:00 p.m. (Eastern) from 5 July to 20 September 1974. It was rebroadcast on Wednesdays at the same time of day from 9 July to 3 September 1975.
