= Viktor Suvorov =

Russian author, former GRU officer (born 1947)

- Владимир Богданович Резун; Виктор Суворов
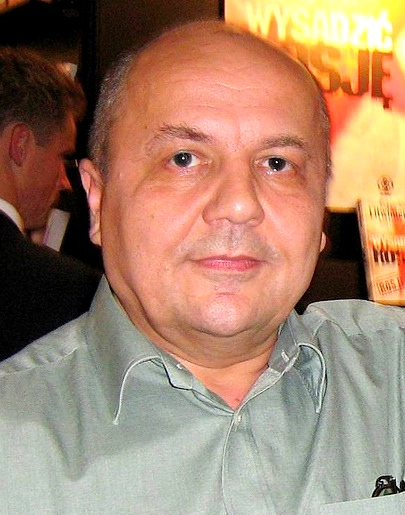
- Suvorov in 2007
- Born: Vladimir Bogdanovich Rezun; 20 April 1947 (age 79); Barabash, Primorsky Krai, Russian SFSR, USSR
- Spouse: Tatiana Korzh
- Writing career
- Notable works: Aquarium, Icebreaker

Vladimir Bogdanovich Rezun (Russian: Владимир Богданович Резун; Ukrainian: Володи́мир Богда́нович Рєзу́н; born 20 April 1947), known by his pseudonym of Viktor Suvorov (Виктор Суворов), is a former Soviet GRU officer who is the author of non-fiction books about World War II, the GRU and the Soviet Army, as well as fictional books about the same and related subjects.

After defecting to the United Kingdom in 1978, Suvorov began his writing career, publishing his first books in the 1980s about his own experiences and the structure of the Soviet military, intelligence, and secret police. He writes in Russian with a number of his books translated into English, including his semi-autobiographical The Liberators (1981). In the USSR, according to Suvorov and according to an interview with the former head of the GRU, he was sentenced to death in absentia.

In his military history books, he offers an alternative view of the role of the USSR in World War II; the first and most well-known book on this topic being Icebreaker: Who started the Second World War?. The proposed concept and the methods of its substantiation have caused numerous discussions and criticism in historical and social circles. In Icebreaker, M Day and several follow-up books Suvorov argued that Joseph Stalin planned to use Nazi Germany as a proxy (the "Icebreaker") against the West. The books are based on his personal analysis of Soviet military investments, diplomatic maneuvers, Politburo speeches and other circumstantial evidence.

Suvorov also wrote a number of fiction books about the Soviet Army, military intelligence and the pre-war history of the USSR. The trilogy Control, Choice and Snake-eater was a bestseller and was approached for movie adaptations. According to Novye Izvestia, an online newspaper, the circulation of some of Suvorov's books exceeds a million copies.

== Early years ==
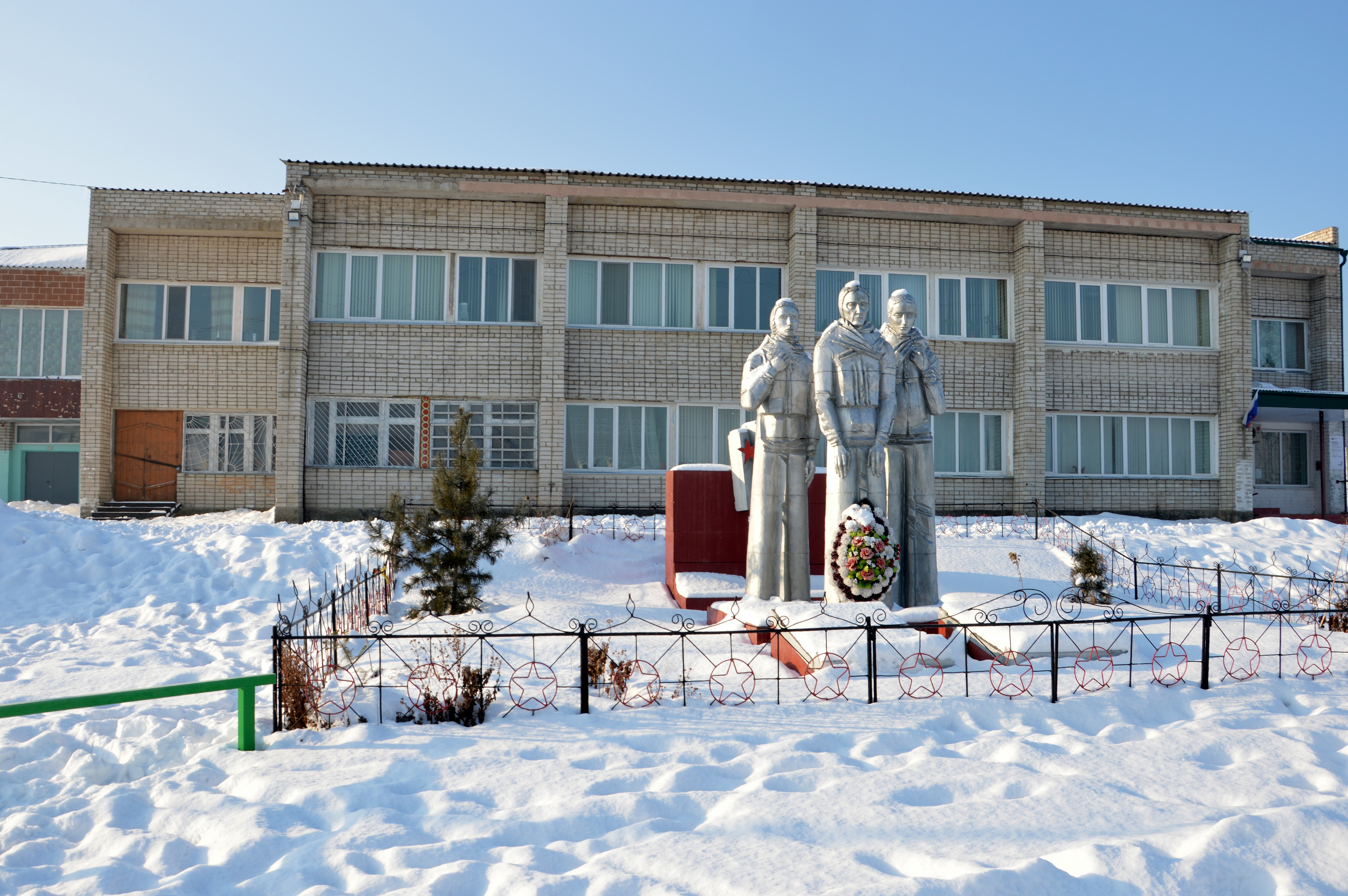
Administration building in Barabash.

Suvorov, born Vladimir Bogdanovich Rezun, comes from a military family of mixed Ukrainian-Russian descent; his father, Bogdan Vasilyevich Rezun, was a veteran of WWII and a Ukrainian, while his mother Vera Spiridonovna Rezun (Gorevalova) is Russian. According to his own statements, Suvorov considers himself, his wife and children to be Ukrainians. He was born in the village of Barabash, Primorsky Krai; raised in Ukraine's Cherkasy, where his father served. The family subsequently settled in Ukrainian Soviet Socialist Republic after his father's retirement.

According to Suvorov, he went to first grade in the village of Slavyanka (Primorsky Territory), then studied in the village of Barabash. In 1957, after graduating on four classes, at the age of 11 he entered the Suvorov Military School in Voronezh (from 1958 to 1963). In 1963, the school was disbanded, and the students, including Rezun, were transferred to the Kalinin (now Tver) Suvorov Military School (from 1963 to 1965). In 1965, Rezun graduated from said school and was admitted without examinations to the second year of the Kyiv Higher Combined Arms Command School then named after General Mikhail Frunze (now Odesa Military Academy).

== Prague Spring invasion ==
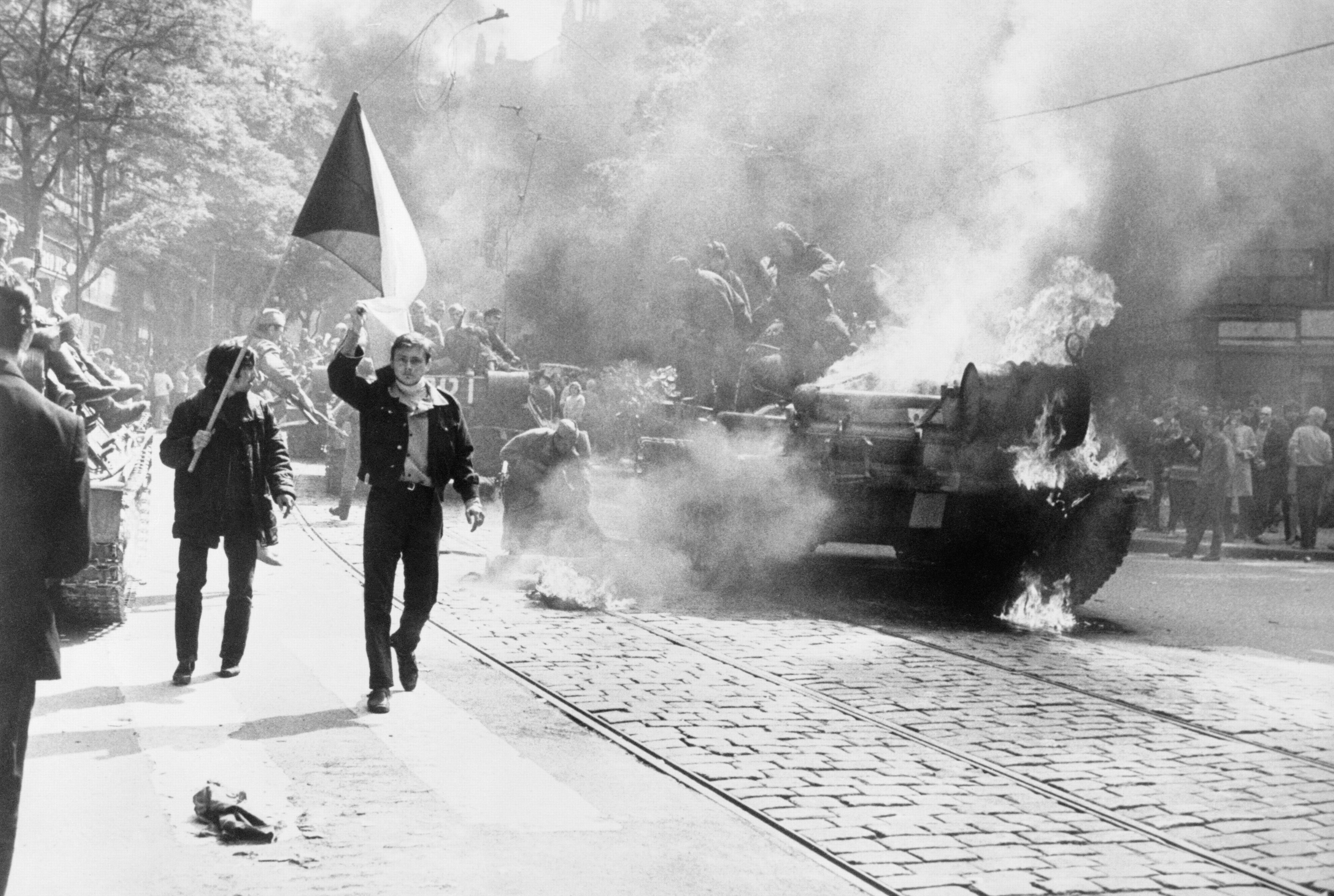
Czechoslovaks carry their national flag past a burning Soviet tank in Prague, August 1968.

In 1968, Suvorov graduated with honours from the Frunze Red Banner Higher Military Command School in Kyiv. At the same year, he served in Chernivtsi as a tank platoon commander with the 145th Guards Motor Rifle Regiment, 66th Guards Training Motor Rifle Division, of the Carpathian Military District in Ukraine, participating in the Warsaw Pact invasion of Czechoslovakia, Operation Danube. This experience is narrated in his 1981 book The Liberators: My Life in the Soviet Army.

The book was Suvorov's first after his defection and in it he narrates his eyewitness account of the invasion, recounting the daily life within the Soviet Army. He points to deficiencies in readiness and in mindset. Suvorov mentions that middle-ranking officers struggled to impress their superiors, something that does not contribute to military effectiveness or discipline – instead fostering on officers a behavior of cunning and deceit in order to climb the ranks.

At the age of 19 he was admitted to the Communist Party of the Soviet Union (CPSU). From 1970 to 1971 he was an officer in the intelligence department of the headquarters of the Volga Military District (in the city of Kuibyshev), and later with the 808th Independent Army Reconnaissance Company (Spetsnaz). In 1970 he became a member of the nomenclature (nomenklatura) of the Central Committee of the CPSU. In this position he came under the patronage of the commander of the Carpathian Military District, Lieutenant General of Tank Forces (later General of the Army) Gennady Obaturov. This general was known for suppressing anti-communist uprisings in Hungary in 1956 and later Czechoslovakia in 1968 with ruthless efficiency, for which Obaturov received the Order of the Red Banner.

== Espionage in Geneva and defection ==
=== Geneva station ===
From 1971 to 1974, Suvorov studied at the Military Diplomatic Academy, known as "the Conservatory", located in Moscow. The Academy trained officers for work abroad as intelligence operatives or "scouts" (razvedchiki in the Russian language). These worked often "under diplomatic cover" ("jackets", in the jargon of Soviet intelligence operatives), and also as "illegals", meaning intelligence operatives not under diplomatic cover or (quasi-declared) commercial cover.

For four years, Suvorov worked in the Geneva GRU as an employee of the legal residency of military intelligence under the cover of the Permanent Mission of the USSR at the European United Nations Office at Geneva. According to the autobiographical book Aquarium, he received the rank of major while working in residency. The same title was named in an interview of 1992 with the newspaper Krasnaya Zvezda by then head of the GRU, Colonel general Yevgeny Timokhin.

=== Defection ===
On 10 June 1978 he disappeared from his Geneva apartment with his wife and two children. According to Suvorov himself, he made contact with British intelligence because the Geneva station wanted to make him a "scapegoat" of a major failure. On 28 June 1978 British newspapers reported that Rezun was in England with his family. At the time, he was married to Tatiana Korzh. The couple had a son, Aleksandr, and a daughter, Oksana. They were smuggled out of Switzerland to Britain by British intelligence. There Suvorov worked as an intelligence analyst for the government and as a lecturer.

Since 1981, he has been writing under the pseudonym Viktor Suvorov, having written his first three books in English: The Liberators, Inside the Soviet Army, and Inside Soviet Military Intelligence. The author explains the choice of pseudonym by the fact that his publisher recommended that he choose a Russian surname of three syllables, evoking a slight "military" association among Western readers. According to Viktor himself, he teaches tactics and military history at a British military academy and lives in Bristol. He supports Ukraine in the Russo-Ukrainian war.

== Publications ==
=== Non-fiction ===
Suvorov drew on his experience and research to write non-fiction books in Russian about the Soviet Army, military intelligence, and special forces. He publishes these works under the pseudonym "Viktor Suvorov."

- The Liberators, includes his eyewitness account about the 1968 invasion of Czechoslovakia by Soviet forces
- Inside the Soviet Army,
- Inside Soviet Military Intelligence
- Aquarium, his memoir, and
- Spetsnaz, about Special Forces units

=== Novels ===
Suvorov also wrote several fiction books set in the pre-World War II era in the Soviet Union.

- Control
- Choice
- Snake-eater (2010)

=== Movies ===
Suvorov was in participant the movie The Soviet Story (2008).

== Works about World War II ==
Suvorov has written ten books about the outbreak of the Nazi-Soviet War in 1941 and the circumstances related to it. The first such work was Icebreaker (1989), followed by M Day, The Last Republic, Cleansing, Suicide, The Shadow of Victory, I Take it Back, The Last Republic II, The Chief Culprit, and Defeat.

In the Icebreaker, M Day and several follow-up books Suvorov argued that Stalin planned to use Nazi Germany as a proxy (the "Icebreaker") against the West. For this reason, Stalin provided significant material and political support to Adolf Hitler, while at the same time preparing the Red Army to "liberate" the whole of Europe from Nazi occupation. Suvorov argued that Hitler had lost World War II from the time when he attacked Poland: not only was he going to war with the powerful Allies, but it was only a matter of time before the Soviet Union would seize the opportune moment to attack him from the rear. According to Suvorov, Hitler decided to direct a preemptive strike at the Soviet Union, while Stalin's forces were redeploying from a defensive to an offensive posture in June 1941. Although Hitler had an important initial tactical advantage, that was strategically hopeless because he subjected the Nazis to having to fight on two fronts. At the end of the war, Stalin achieved only some of his initial objectives by establishing Communist regimes in Eastern Europe, China and North Korea. According to Suvorov, this made Stalin the primary winner of World War II, even though he was not satisfied by the outcome, having intended to establish Soviet domination over the whole continent of Europe.

Most historians agreed that the geopolitical differences between the Soviet Union and the Axis made war inevitable, and that Stalin had made extensive preparations for war and exploited the military conflict in Europe to his advantage. However, there was a debate among historians as to whether Joseph Stalin planned to attack Axis forces in Eastern Europe in the summer of 1941. A number of historians, such as Gabriel Gorodetsky and David Glantz disputed or rejected this claim. But it received some support from others, such as Valeri Danilov, Joachim Hoffmann, Mikhail Meltyukhov, and Vladimir Nevezhin.

== Other works ==
=== About the Cold War-era Soviet Union ===
- The Liberators: My Life in the Soviet Army, 1981, Hamish Hamilton, ISBN 0-241-10675-3
- Inside the Soviet Army, 1982, Macmillan Publishing.
- Inside Soviet Military Intelligence, 1984, ISBN 0-02-615510-9
- Aquarium (Аквариум), 1985, Hamish Hamilton, ISBN 0-241-11545-0, memoir
- Spetsnaz. The Story Behind the Soviet SAS, 1987, Hamish Hamilton, ISBN 0-241-11961-8
- Devil's Mother (Майката на дявола), 2011, Sofia, Fakel Express, ISBN 978-954-9772-76-0

=== About the outbreak of the Nazi-Soviet War ===
- Icebreaker (Ледокол) (1980s), Hamish Hamilton Ltd, ISBN 0-241-12622-3
- Day "M" (День "М")
- Suicide. For what reason did Hitler attack the Soviet Union? (Самоубийство), Moscow, ACT, 2000, ISBN 5-17-003119-X
- The Last Republic, ACT, 1997, ASIN B00271256C
- Cleansing (Очищение). Purification. Why did Stalin behead his army?, Moscow, 2002, ISBN 5-17-009254-7
- Last Republic II. Why did the Soviet Union lose the Second World War? (Последната република II), Sofia, Fakel Express, 2007, ISBN 978-954-9772-51-7
- The Chief Culprit: Stalin's Grand Design to Start World War II.. Annapolis, MD: Naval Institute Press, 2008 (hardcover, ISBN 978-1-59114-838-8).
- Defeat. Why was the "great victory" worse than any defeat? (Разгромът), Sofia, Fakel Express, 2009, ISBN 978-954-9772-68-5

=== About Soviet historical figures ===
- Shadow of Victory (Тень победы), 2003. This questions the status and image of General Georgy Zhukov, known for his defense of the Soviet Union and later victory in the Battle of Berlin. The first book of a trilogy under the same name.
- I Take It Back (Беру свои слова обратно), is also about Georgy Zhukov. this is the second book of the "Shadow of Victory" trilogy.

=== Fiction ===
- Control (Контроль), novel
- Choice (Выбор), novel
- Snake-eater (Змееед), novel (Sofia, Fakel Express, 2010), ISBN 978-954977269-2

== See also ==
- Causes of World War II
- List of Eastern Bloc defectors
- Soviet offensive plans controversy
- Soviet–German relations before 1941
