= Aquarium (Suvorov) =

1985 book by Viktor Suvorov

- Hardcover edition
- Author: Viktor Suvorov
- Language: English
- Subject: Espionage
- Genre: Non-fiction
- Publisher: Hamish Hamilton
- Publication date: June 1, 1985
- Publication place: United Kingdom
- Media type: Print (Hardback)
- Pages: 249 pp.
- ISBN: 978-0241115459

Aquarium (Russian title Аквариум) is a partly-autobiographical description by Viktor Suvorov of the GRU (Soviet military intelligence directorate). The book was initially released on June 1, 1985, by Hamish Hamilton.

== Overview ==
The account starts in 1969, when Suvorov, as an ordinary tank company commander, is recruited into intelligence analysis by an up-and-coming lieutenant colonel. From there, he transfers to Spetsnaz and, from there, into the GRU. A combination of circumstances leads to his eventual defection to the United Kingdom.

The "Aquarium" of the title is the nickname given to GRU headquarters in Moscow by those who work there. "What sort of fish are there swimming there?" asks Suvorov of his boss when he learns about it. "There's only one kind there—piranhas."

Suvorov admits that some details of his career have been altered; for example, he portrays himself as being posted to Austria when, in fact, he was in Switzerland. The reasons given are to hide his identity while the Soviet Union still existed and to protect from retaliation against friends and relatives.

== Film ==
A film and four-part television series based on the book were made by a Polish-Ukrainian-German team in 1996. The film, entitled The Aquarium (Akwarium), was directed by Antoni Krauze and stars Jurij Smolskij as Suvorov (with his Polish voice track dubbed by Zbigniew Suszyński), with Janusz Gajos, Witold Pyrkosz and Henryk Bista. It is available in Polish with English subtitles. The film was a condensed version of the television series, which consisted of four episodes, and was titled: Akwarium, czyli samotność szpiega (Aquarium, or: The Loneliness of the Spy.)

== Publication details ==
- Original English translation: Hamish Hamilton, 1985; ISBN 0-241-11545-0
- United States publication (as Inside the Aquarium): Macmillan, 1985; ISBN 0-02-615490-0
- Akwarium, first publication in Poland (following earlier episodic printing in newspapers, and an underground press printing in 1988), vastly expanded in comparison to the English version, and with Suvorov's new afterword: Editions Spotkania, 1990; ISBN 2-86914-051-7
