= Aquarium station (MBTA) =

Subway station in Boston, Massachusetts, US

Aquarium
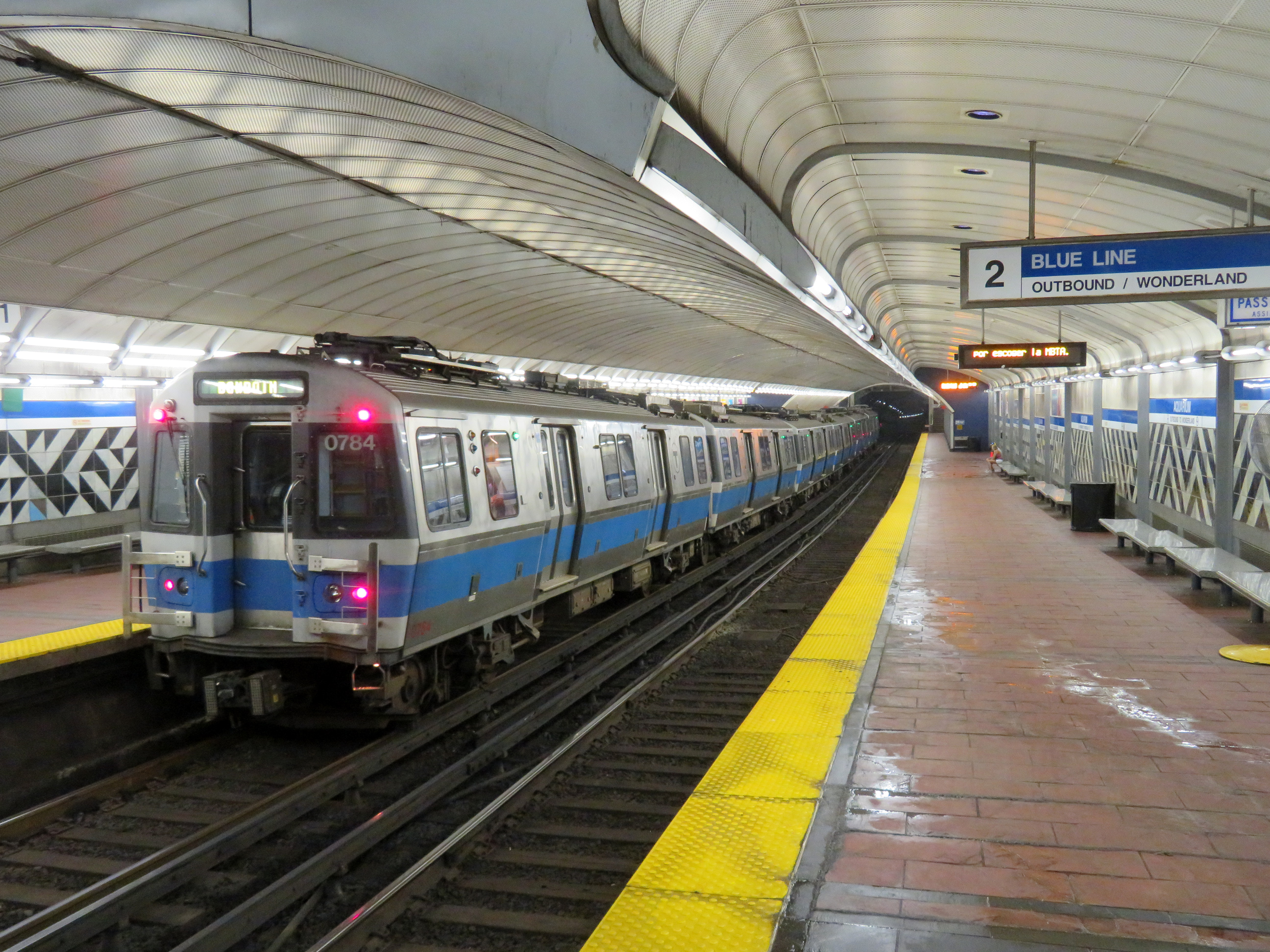
- A westbound train at Aquarium station in July 2019

General information
- Location: 183 State Street; Boston, Massachusetts
- Coordinates: 42.3596°N 71.0523°W
- Line: East Boston Tunnel
- Platforms: 2 side platforms
- Tracks: 2
- Connections: MBTA bus: 4 MBTA ferry: F2H, F3, F4, F5 (at Long Wharf); F6, F7, F8, F10 (at Central Wharf)

Construction
- Structure type: Underground
- Accessible: Yes

History
- Opened: August 22, 1901 (Atlantic Avenue Elevated); April 5, 1906 (East Boston Tunnel)
- Closed: September 30, 1938 (Atlantic Avenue Elevated)
- Rebuilt: April 1924; 1948–1950; 1968; 1996–2004
- Former names: Atlantic Avenue (1906–1967); State Street (elevated station)

Passengers
- FY2019: 5,130 daily boardings

Services
Preceding station	MBTA	Following station
State toward Bowdoin	Blue Line	Maverick toward Wonderland
Former services
Preceding station	Boston Elevated Railway	Following station
Rowes Wharf toward South Station or Dudley	Atlantic Avenue Elevated Closed 1938	Battery Street toward North Station
Location

Aquarium station is an underground rapid transit station on the MBTA Blue Line in Boston, Massachusetts, United States. It is located under State Street at Atlantic Avenue on the eastern edge of Boston's Financial District near Boston Harbor. The station is named for the nearby New England Aquarium. It is adjacent to Long Wharf and near Central Wharf, both used by MBTA ferry routes. The station has two side platforms serving the two tracks of the Blue Line; an arched ceiling runs the length of the platform level. With the platforms 50 feet (15 m) below street level, it is the second-deepest station on the MBTA system (after Porter station).

The Boston Elevated Railway (BERy) opened the Atlantic Avenue Elevated on August 22, 1901, with a station at State Street. The BERy opened the East Boston Tunnel under State Street and Long Wharf for streetcars on December 30, 1904. Construction of the intermediate station at Atlantic Avenue under the Elevated was delayed; it opened on April 5, 1906. Unlike other early stations in Boston, which were built with cut-and-cover tunneling, most of Atlantic Avenue station was built as a large barrel vault. The access shaft at the east end of the station was topped with a three-story headhouse, which included a footbridge to the elevated station. Four unusual angled elevators connected the headhouse to the platforms.

In 1924, the Boston Transit Department implemented a long-planned project to convert the tunnel from streetcars to high-floor metro trains, with high platforms added at the station. The Atlantic Avenue Elevated closed in 1938, while the subway station remained open. In 1948, the city began replacing the old headhouse and elevators with a smaller structure and escalators. On January 28, 1949, a welder ignited a grease fire that exploded down an elevator shaft, killing three people and burning numerous others. The station was closed until the completion of the renovations in January 1950. The station was renamed Aquarium in 1967 as part of rebranding by the 1964-formed Massachusetts Bay Transportation Authority (MBTA).

The MBTA began construction on a major renovation of the station in 1996. The platforms were lengthened for six-car trains, new entrances were added west of Atlantic Avenue, and the station was made fully accessible. The station was closed from October 14, 2000 to October 29, 2001; major construction was completed in 2003. Since the renovation, the station has had water leakage issues; it also occasionally floods during high tides and storm surges. The proposed North-South Rail Link includes a possible Central Station for MBTA Commuter Rail trains located under Aquarium station.

== Station layout ==
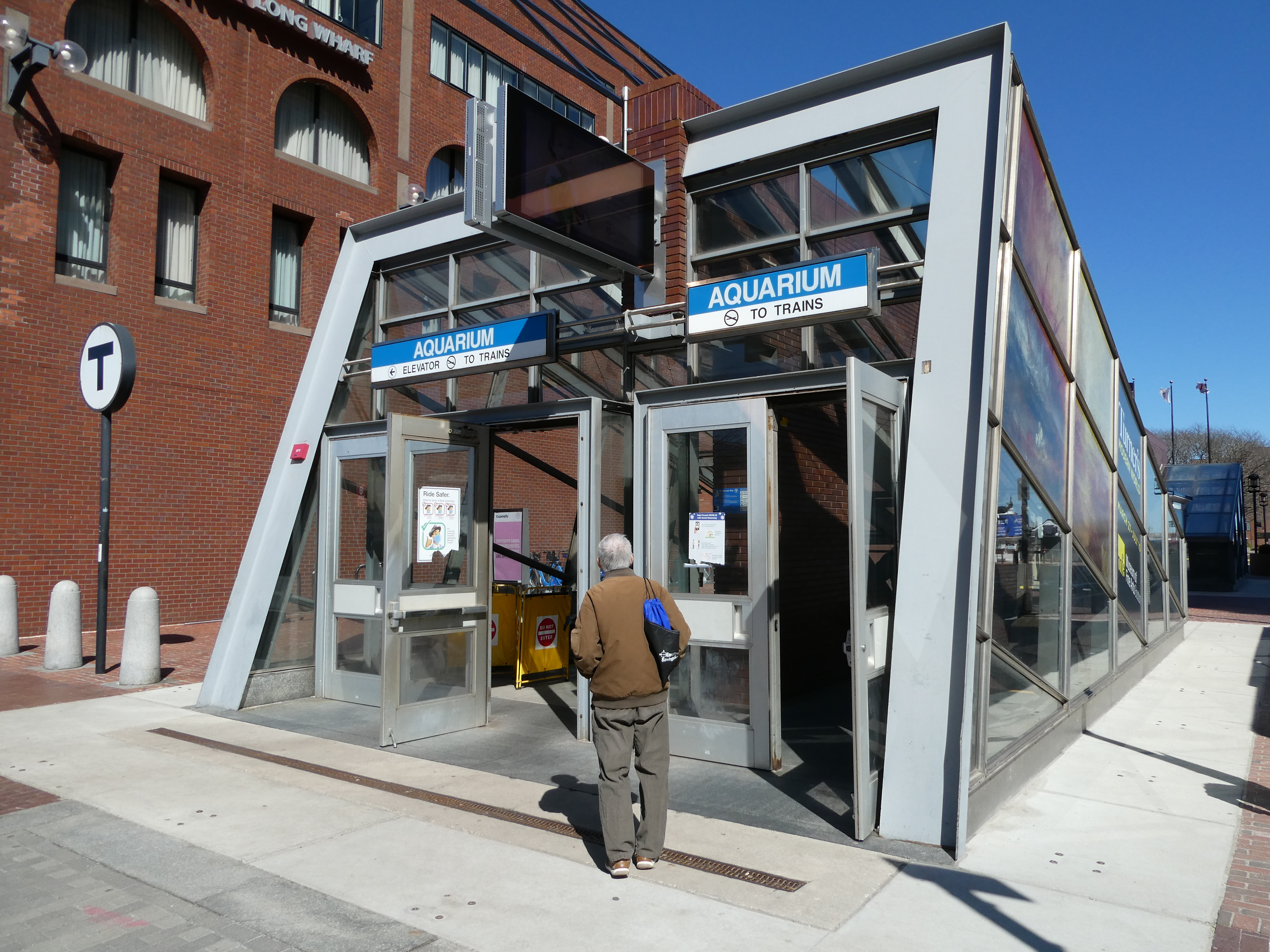
The main east headhouse on Long Wharf

Aquarium station is located under State Street at its intersection with Atlantic Avenue, near the edge of Boston Harbor. The station has two side platforms—each long enough for six-car trains—serving the two tracks of the Blue Line. The platforms are 50 feet (15 m) below street level, making it the second-deepest station on the MBTA system after Porter station. The Tip O'Neill Tunnel, which carries Interstate 93, passes over the center of the station and is supported by its roof. The older eastern part of the platform level has an arched ceiling, which widens to a triple vault in the newer western section.

Mezzanines with faregates are located at both ends of the station. The east mezzanine is located on the west end of Long Wharf, near the New England Aquarium. Two glass headhouses—one with escalators and stairs, the other with an elevator—provide access from the surface. The west mezzanine is located under State Street west of Atlantic Avenue, near the Custom House Tower. That mezzanine is accessed by a headhouse—which includes an elevator—on the south side of State Street, as well as a smaller entrance inside a building on the north side of the street.

The station is also served by the MBTA bus route 4, which runs on Atlantic Avenue at peak hours. Aquarium station is the primary transfer point between the MBTA subway and ferry services on Boston Harbor: MBTA ferry routes F2H, F3, F4, and F5 terminate at Long Wharf, as do several Boston Harbor Islands ferry routes; MBTA ferry routes F6, F7, F8, and F10 terminate at nearby Central Wharf.

== History ==
=== State Street station ===
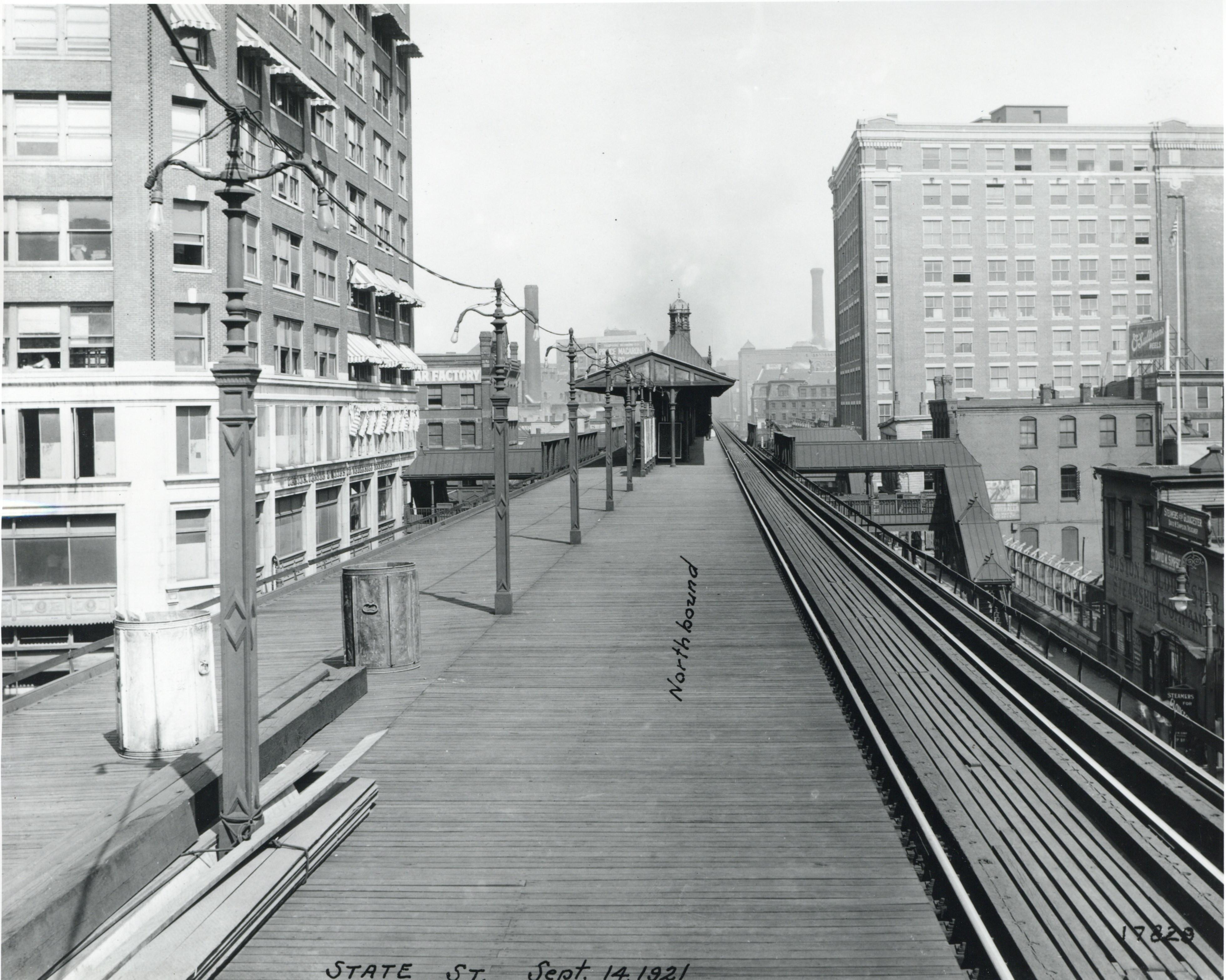
State Street station in 1921

Construction of the Atlantic Avenue Elevated began on January 21, 1901. The Boston Elevated Railway (BERy) opened the line on August 22, 1901, including a stop at State Street. Like the other four stations on the line, State Street had a single elevated island platform with a single mezzanine underneath. Passengers entered the station from staircases on either side of Atlantic Avenue north of State Street, and exited on two staircases to the south. The platform was originally three cars—about 140 feet (43 m)—long; an extension to allow four-car trains was completed on June 13, 1902.

=== Atlantic Avenue station ===
On May 5, 1900, the Boston Transit Commission (BTC) began construction on the East Boston Tunnel—a streetcar tunnel between East Boston and downtown Boston under Boston Harbor. Construction started near the eastern terminus in Maverick Square, as the route in downtown Boston was not yet determined. Not until July 25, 1901 did the Commission determine that the Tunnel would run under State Street, with a station at Atlantic Avenue next to busy Long Wharf. The station was constructed in two sections under separate contracts. "Atlantic Chambers", which served as the west end of the underwater portion of the tunnel, was built in an open cut just west of Atlantic Avenue; it housed the elevators and stairways to access the station as well as the ticket booths. The main arched station, to the west of Atlantic Chambers, was built with drifts. The two side platforms were 160 feet (49 m) long, 10 feet (3.0 m) wide, and 54 feet (16 m) below the surface.

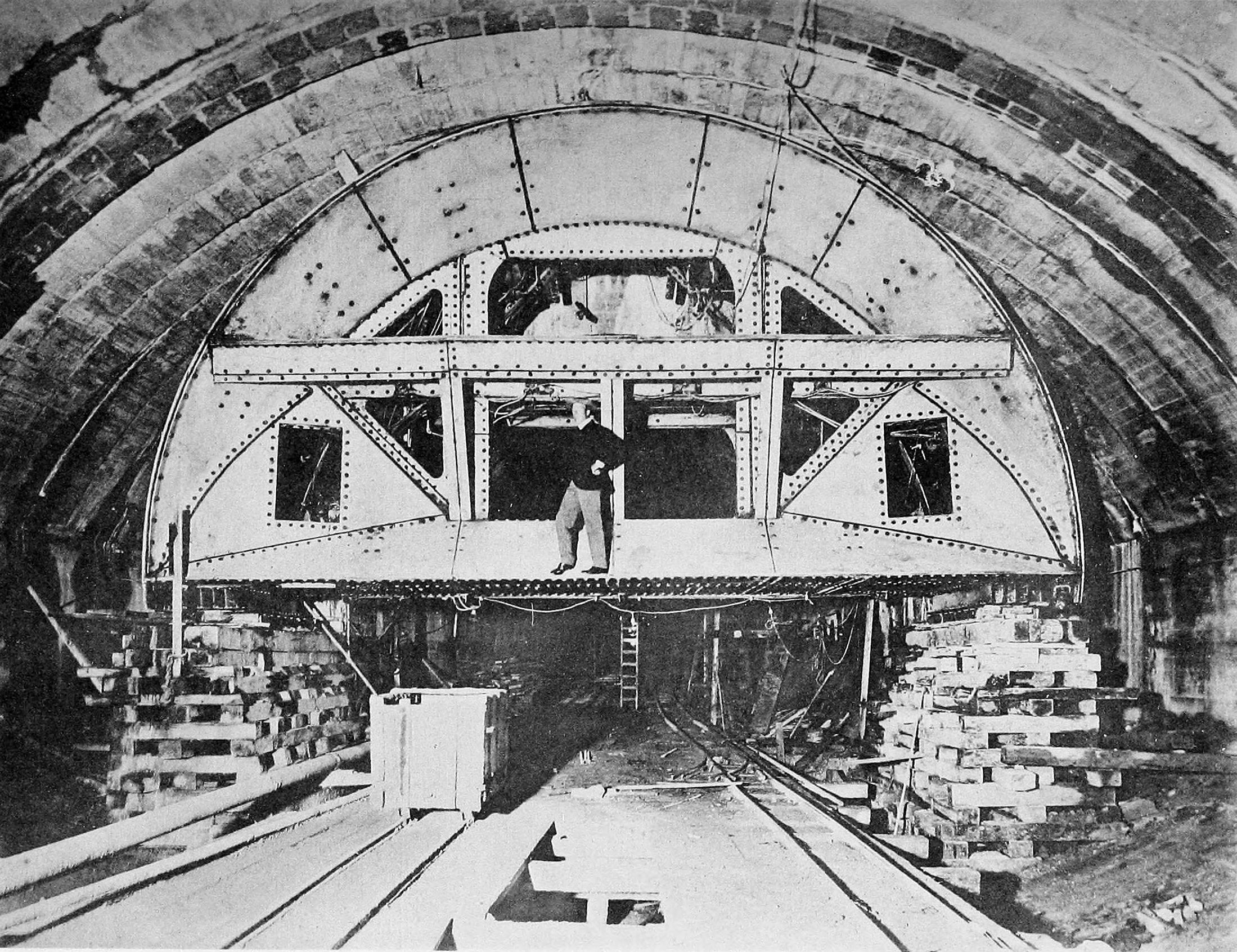
The tunneling shield inside the station arch in 1903

Atlantic Chambers was a rectangular shaft measuring 40 feet (12 m) by 57 feet 4 inches (17.5 m), divided by three floors into four smaller chambers. The reinforced concrete walls were between 1 3/4 and 3 feet (0.5 and 0.9 m) thick. At the east end of each platform was a 18 by 32 feet (5.5 m × 9.8 m) space for elevators and stairs; these two rooms and the trackway between them occupied the lowest chamber. Construction of Atlantic Chambers began on December 5, 1901, and excavation was complete by May 29, 1903. On June 19, 1903, compressed air in the tunnel to the east blew out the bulkhead into Atlantic Chambers, killing two workers. This air pressure had been necessary to keep water from seeping into the tunnel; after the accident, Atlantic Avenue settled slightly above the tunnel. It was necessary to use additional dunnage to limit sagging of the elevated line above; even so, elevated operations were impacted from June 20 to October 7, 1903.

Unlike other early stations in Boston, which were built with cut-and-cover tunneling, most of Atlantic Avenue station was built as a large barrel vault. Drifts were first used to construct the vertical station walls, then the crown of the arch. Transverse sections of the arch were then completed, followed by the invert. The arch was 40.5 feet (12.3 m) wide and 26 feet (7.9 m) tall; the walls of the station were 4 feet 3 inches (1.3 m) thick and the arch 3 feet (0.9 m) thick. Work began on this section on March 17, 1902; the last section of arch was completed on June 26, 1903. The rough work of the station vault was completed on August 28, 1903, with the tilework finished on January 19, 1904, and the granolithic platforms on February 10. The Paris Métro train fire in August 1903 led the BTC and BERy to desire emergency exits from stations with only a single headhouse. A pair of curved staircases were built from the western ends of the platform; they joined to form a straight staircase above the arch of the tunnel. The exit stairs were completed on September 6, 1904, with a small building in State Street covering them completed on October 10.

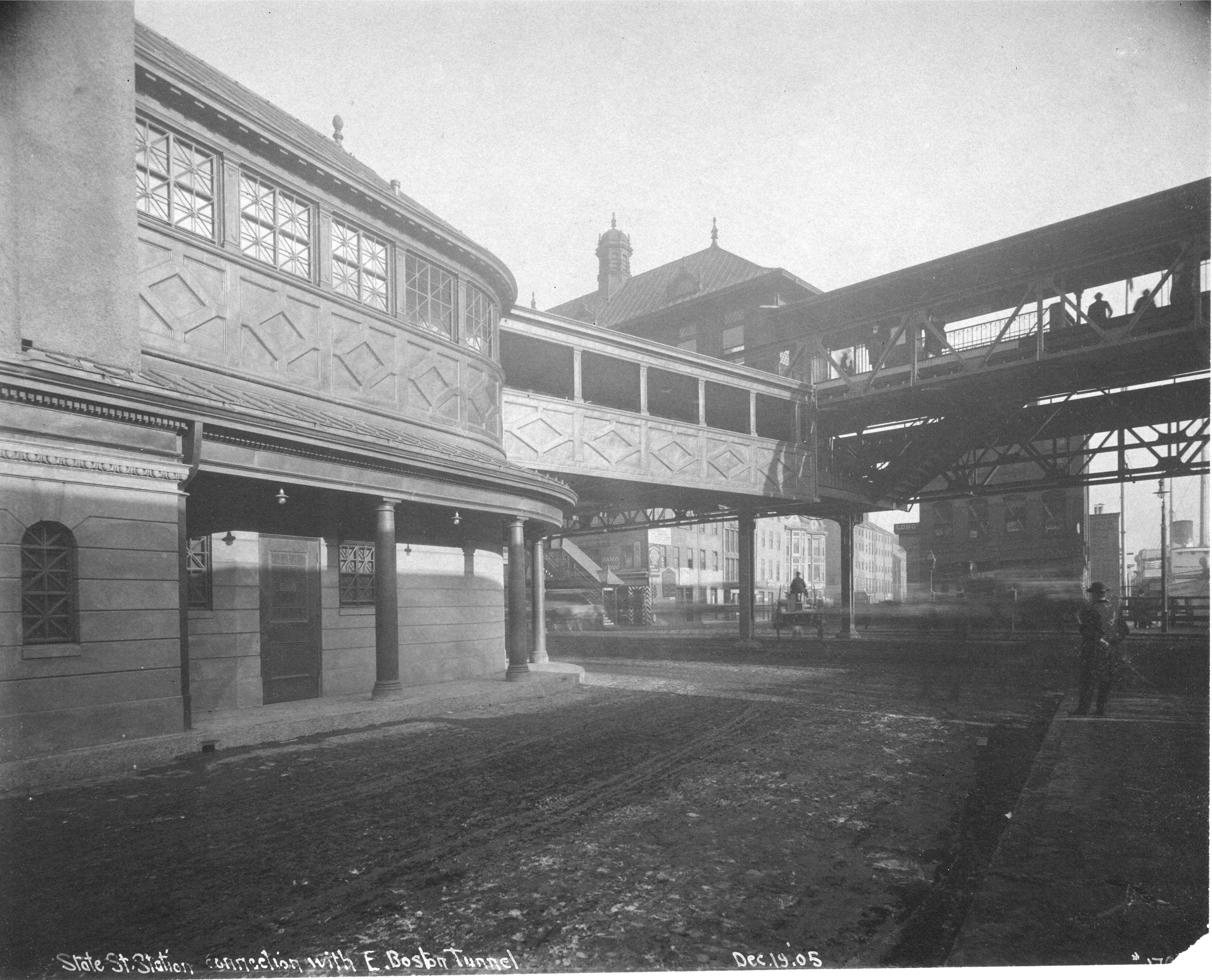
The headhouse and State Street station in 1905

A three-story headhouse, measuring 84 by 29 feet (25.6 m × 8.8 m), was built over Atlantic Chambers. The ground floor contained the main entrance and exit for the station. The second floor (of nearly identical plan) served a footbridge to the fare mezzanine of State Street station, while the third floor was a machine room for the elevators. The headhouse was designed by Charles Brigham, who had previously designed the Scollay Square and Adams Square headhouses for the Tremont Street Subway. Shafts leading to the headhouse served as the primarily ventilation for the Boston end of the tunnel. Each platform was served with two elevators, which rose 56 feet (17 m) to the ground floor and 14 feet (4.3 m) more to the footbridge level. Because the elevators needed to serve the separated platforms and the narrower headhouse, they were built with an angled section with approximately 6.5 feet (2.0 m) of vertical travel. The elevators were about 25 feet (7.6 m) apart on the platforms and 10 feet (3.0 m) apart at both headhouse levels; as late as the 1940s, the elevators were unique among subway stations.

The BTC and BERy agreed in November 1903 to include the footbridge. However, the two could not agree on who should pay for the elevators: the BERy maintained they were a fundamental part of the station infrastructure and thus the responsibility of the BTC, while the BTC considered them an operational item and thus the domain of the BERy. In March 1904, they reached an agreement to allow construction of the elevators and headhouse (so as not to delay the station) while deferring the cost question. (The matter was not settled until a Massachusetts Supreme Judicial Court ruling in 1913.) The BTC awarded the contract for the headhouse on August 15, 1904, with completion scheduled for December 15; however, manufacture of the steel components was severely delayed. The East Boston Tunnel opened on December 30, 1904, serving streetcars which ran between Court Street downtown and Maverick portal in East Boston, where they joined existing surface lines. The only intermediate stop was at Devonshire; Atlantic Avenue station was not yet complete. Most of the headhouse except for some detail work was completed by July 1905; the elevators were tested in January 1906. Atlantic Avenue station opened in the tunnel on April 5, 1906. The Atlantic Avenue and State Street stations had separate fare gates; a paper transfer was required to change lines.

=== Modifications ===
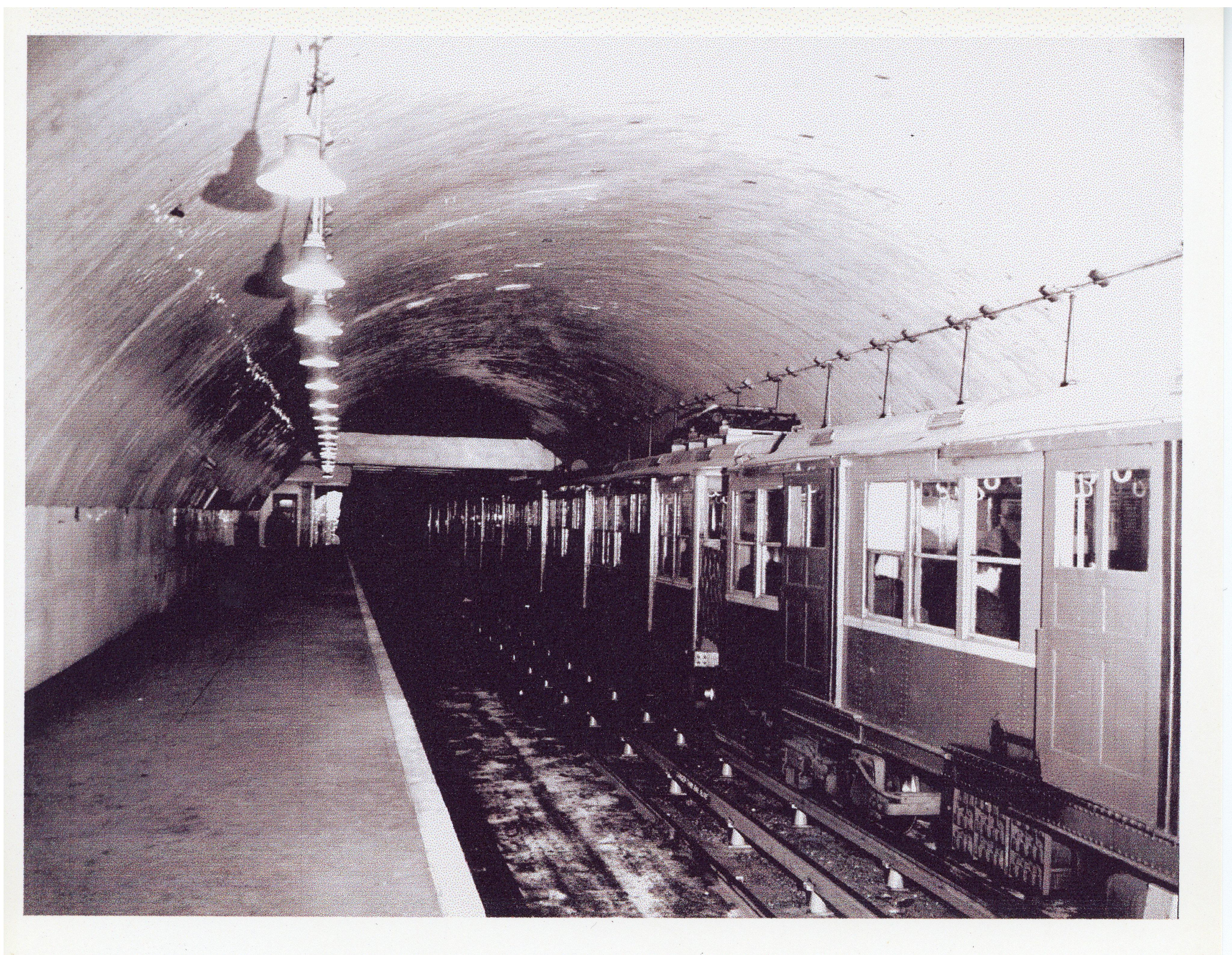
The station in 1963 showing the 1924-added high-level platforms

In August 1908, the elevated platform was again expanded southwards, this time to eight-car length—about 370 feet (110 m)—to match the length of platforms in the nearly-complete Washington Street Tunnel. An extension of the elevated mezzanine and a second exit stairwell from the elevated platform to the mezzanine opened on October 26, 1908. In 1926, significant repairs were made to the Atlantic Chamber (the headhouse of Atlantic Avenue station).

==== Platform raising ====
The East Boston Tunnel was originally planned to be operated with high-floor metro rolling stock and connected to the then-planned Cambridge Elevated line. When that plan was dropped in 1903 due to a disagreement between the BTC and the BERy, the stations were built with low platforms. Large bi-loading streetcars (with high floors but capable of loading from low platforms), which incorporated many attributes from metro cars used on the Main Line El, began use in 1905. However, neither these nor the large center-entrance cars introduced in 1917 (which were designed for multiple unit operation) could fully handle the crowds.

In 1921, the Boston Transit Department (BTD)—the successor to the BTC—began work at Maverick Square to convert the East Boston Tunnel to high-floor metro trains. The next year, the BTD board approved the construction of high-level platforms at Atlantic Avenue, Devonshire, Scollay Under, and Bowdoin. Construction of concrete high-level platforms 40 inches (1.0 m) above the rails at Atlantic Avenue began in December 1923 or January 1924. A section of low-level platform was left to serve streetcars during construction. Over the weekend of April 18–21, 1924, the East Boston Tunnel was converted to high-floor metro stock. Temporary wooden platform sections were put in place to allow service to begin on April 21, with the permanent concrete sections completed by July 12. The elevators at Atlantic Avenue were also modified for the new platform heights. The edges of the original low platforms can still be seen under the high platforms.

==== Fire and new headhouse ====
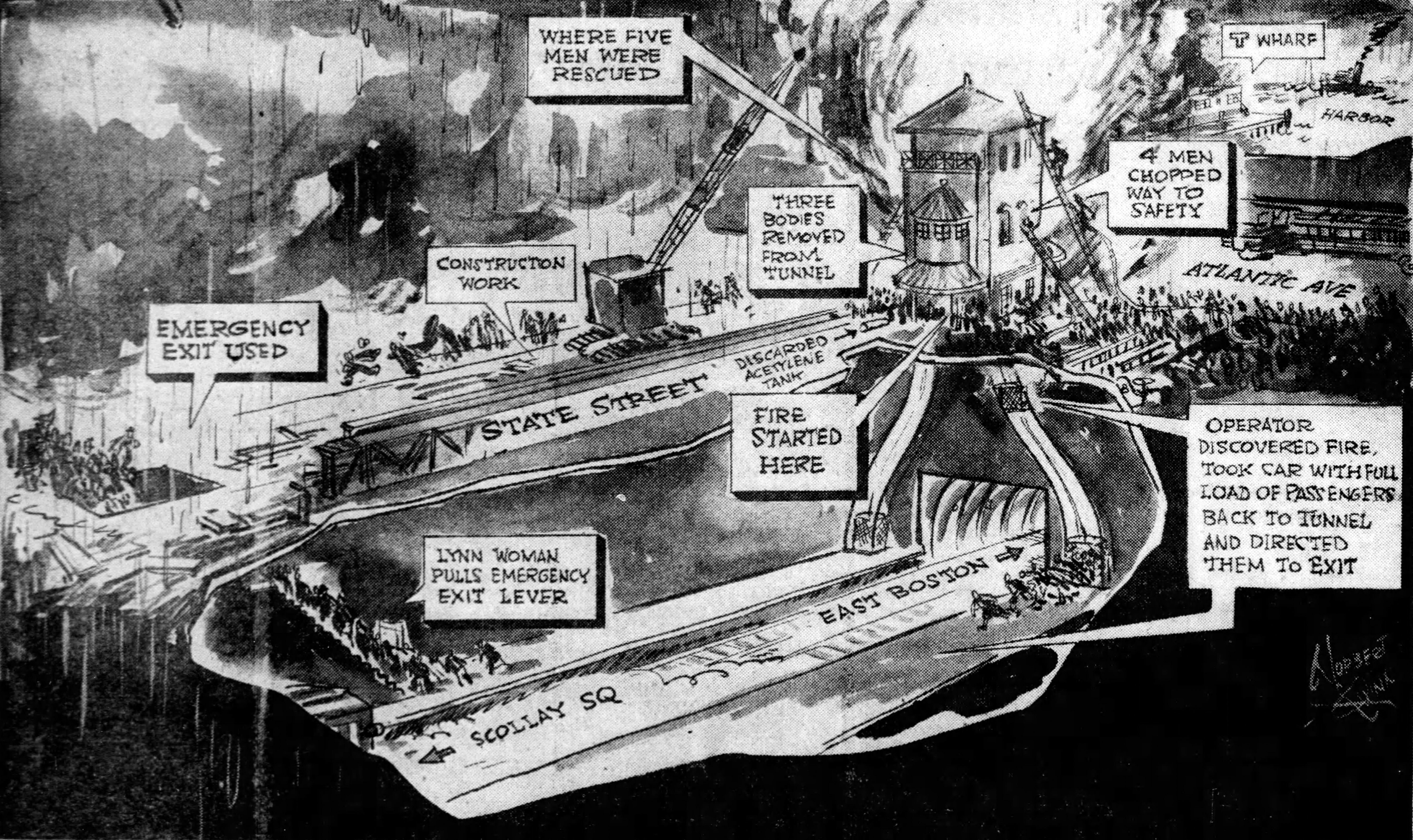
A diagram of the 1949 fire

The East Boston Tunnel cut sharply into East Boston ferry ridership, which in turn reduced connecting ridership on the Atlantic Avenue Elevated. The Elevated closed on September 30, 1938, and was torn down during World War II for scrap metal. With the aging headhouse and its connection to the Elevated no longer needed, the city began planning a modernization of the station. A $242,000 contract to purchase four escalators was approved on October 17, 1946. In 1948, the Boston Transit Department awarded a $350,000 contract to add the new escalators, remove the elevators, and construct a new headhouse on the north side of State Street.

On January 28, 1949, a grease fire ignited by the acetylene torch of a welder removing one of the elevators spread down the elevator shaft and onto the platforms. The fire occurred during the morning rush hour, with 300 passengers having just alighted from an eastbound train. Most escaped through the emergency exit, which was opened by a passenger, while some used the stairs in the main headhouse. Three people died in the headhouse: two passengers who missed the ground-level exit in the smoke while climbing the stairs and became trapped on the second floor, and one construction worker. The fire was compared to the 1942 Cocoanut Grove fire due to the intensity of the victims' burns.

After the fire, the station was closed until construction was completed. The fire sparked political debate into the safety record of the MTA (which had replaced the BERy in 1947), and which entity was to blame: the city owned the subway lines and stations within its borders, while the MTA operated them. The new headhouse was a rectangular structure made of limestone and granite in the Stripped Classical style, with four escalators replacing the old elevators. The station reopened on January 12, 1950.

=== MBTA era ===
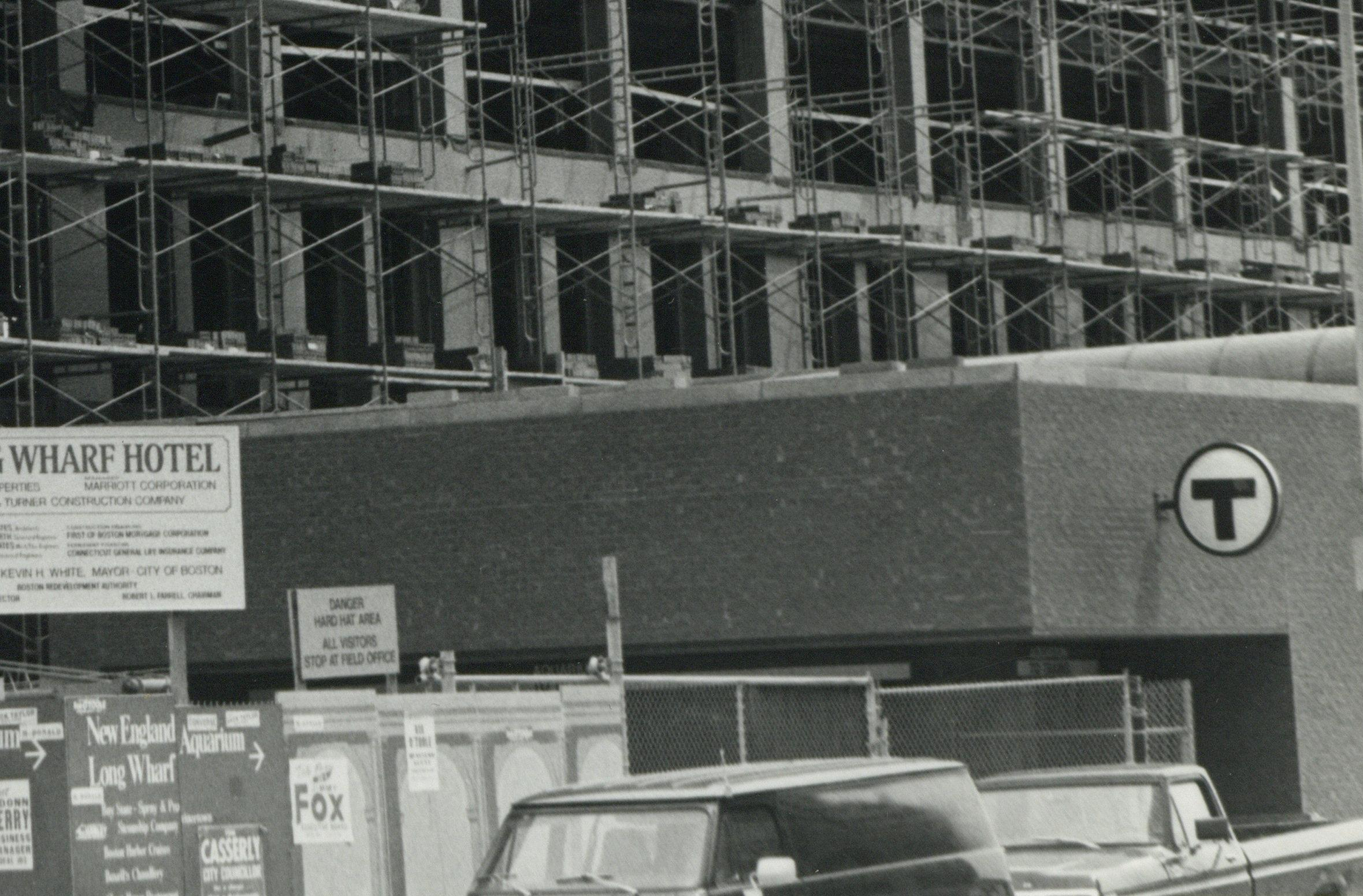
The 1950-opened headhouse around 1980

The construction of the Central Artery in the 1950s left the station cut off from Downtown Boston to the west. Atlantic Avenue station was renamed Aquarium on February 13, 1967, as part of a general rebranding by the newly created MBTA. The then-under-construction New England Aquarium, which opened in 1969, was only 600 feet (180 m) from the existing station. The subway lines were given colored identifying names, with the East Boston Tunnel route becoming the Blue Line, and several other downtown stations were renamed.

The station was modernized as part of a $9 million systemwide station improvement program, with a dedication ceremony on August 26, 1968. The renovation included a steel-and-fiberglass ceiling liner intended to reduce water intrusion and noise. Porcelain panels on the station walls were decorated with fish drawings from a 19th-century book. The headhouse was not substantially modified; it was expected to be rebuilt later as part of a New England Telephone building.

In the 1970s, part of Atlantic Avenue was relocated a block to the west under the Central Artery for redevelopment, which left Aquarium station on the east side of the realigned street. With its platforms some 50 feet (15 m) below street level, Aquarium was the deepest station on the MBTA until Porter station opened in 1984. The aging escalators were responsible for several injuries, including in 1995 when a three-year-old's leg was badly cut.

==== Reconstruction ====
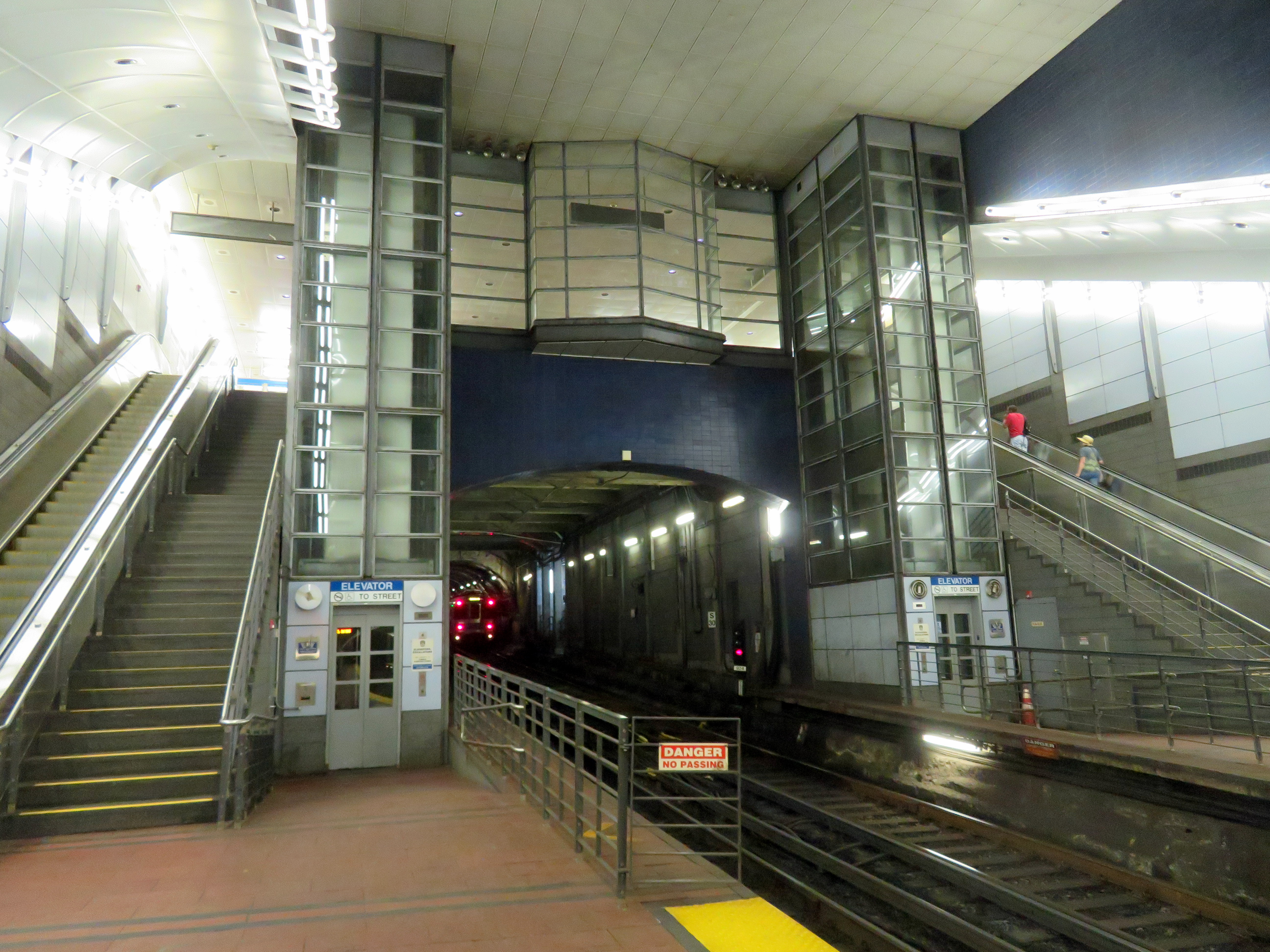
The west end of the platforms, showing the elevators to the west mezzanine added in the 1996-2003 reconstruction

In 1988, the MBTA began a major renovation project to lengthen Blue Line station platforms for use of six-car trains. On February 14, 1990, the MBTA board voted to move the renovation of Aquarium station—including a new entrance on State Street—into final design. The contract for final design was not awarded until June 20, 1992, due to changes associated with the Big Dig project. The revised design called for a reinforced box structure, in which the new Central Artery tunnel would sit, on top of the station arch. In October 1995, the state opened bidding on an estimated $268 million project, which included the station renovations plus the Central Artery tunnel section from State Street to High Street.

In 1996, the MBTA began construction of the renovation and platform lengthening project at Aquarium. The work took place during the Big Dig, which moved the Central Artery to the new tunnel and built the Rose Fitzgerald Kennedy Greenway on the surface. The station was fully closed from October 14, 2000 to October 29, 2001; State was temporarily named "State/Aquarium" during the closure, and a shuttle bus (route 650) was run between the two stations. Two new entrances were added on State Street west of Atlantic Avenue. A new headhouse with an elevator on the south side of State Street opened on October 29, 2001, and was temporarily the only entrance to the station; an entrance on the north side of the street in the Marketplace Center building opened soon after. The renovated Long Wharf entrance, with two headhouses on the east side of the Kennedy Greenway, did not reopen until September 22, 2003. The entire reconstruction cost $110 million.

The reconstructed station was designed by Harry Ellenzweig, who had previously designed Alewife station for the MBTA decades earlier. The original station was extended westward, with wider platforms in the new section. The western extension has a "triple vaulted aluminum ceiling", with the middle vault matching the curve of the original arch. The fare mezzanines on each end of the station have red slate floors, and aluminum panels cover the walls and ceilings. The headhouses were intended to mimic nearby buildings: the western headhouse incorporates a granite element similar to the adjacent State Street Block, while the sloped eastern headhouses include bricks matching the adjacent Marriott Long Wharf. The lower part of the platform walls are covered by Currents (originally Untitled Wall), a pair of 350-foot (110 m)-long black-and-white tile mosaics by Jun Kaneko. They were installed as part of the Arts on the Line program.

==== Water issues ====
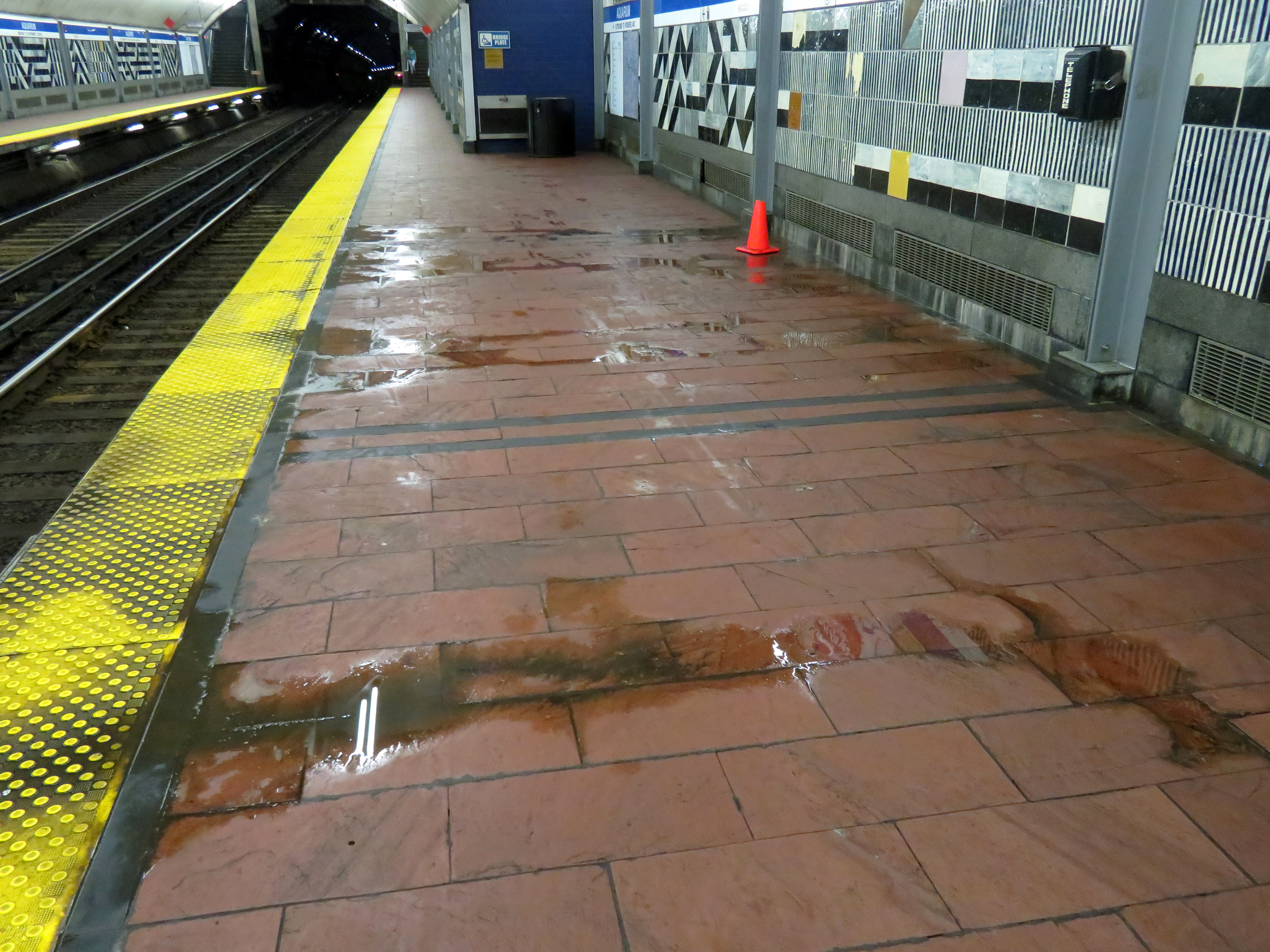
Water leaks on the eastbound platform, photographed in 2019

Since the 1996–2003 reconstruction, Aquarium station has been plagued by water leaks, which may have been caused either by the renovation or by adjacent Big Dig construction. (Leakage was noticed in the station even before its 1906 opening, albeit at a much smaller rate, and during the 20th century.) The location of the east headhouse near Boston Harbor has resulted in additional flooding during king tides and storm surges. On January 4, 2018, the station was flooded with ocean water associated with the surge from the January 2018 North American blizzard. It was closed "indefinitely" but ultimately reopened the next day. A nor'easter that March caused flooding that again briefly closed the station. These floods damaged elevators and escalators at the station, leaving them out of service for months.

In 2019, the MBTA began using temporary barriers to control flooding at Aquarium during storms. A permanent fix for both leaks and flooding was estimated to cost $20–40 million. A 14-day closure of the Blue Line for maintenance work in May 2020 included drainage work at Aquarium. A $1.7 million project, which took place from August 2020 to March 2021, added supports for aluminum planks that can be temporarily installed during high water events.

==== Central Station proposal ====
The North–South Rail Link (NSRL) is a proposed railway tunnel which would link the two halves of the MBTA Commuter Rail system between North Station and South Station under downtown Boston. It was originally proposed to run deep beneath the Central Artery, passing under Aquarium station at a depth of 130 feet (40 m). In 2003, the MBTA released the Major Investment Study/Draft Environmental Impact Report, which considered two-track and four-track NSRL designs with or without an intermediate Central Station. The station would have 800-foot-long (240 m) platforms between State Street and Broad Street. It would have four headhouses—two just north of Milk Street, and two just south of India Street and East India Row—plus a direct connection to Aquarium station. The report estimated that adding Central Station would increase commuter rail ridership by between 3,500 and 12,800 daily trips (depending on other elements of the tunnel design), but add between $540 million and $817 million (about one-sixth) to the total costs of construction. During the renovation of Aquarium station, slurry walls were built to a depth of 190 feet (58 m) to futureproof for the construction of the NSRL and Central Station.

A 2018 re-evaluation of the NSRL examined two-track and four-track alternatives under the Central Artery, as well as two-track alternatives under Congress Street (which was rejected in the 2003 report). Only the more-expensive four-track option would include Central Station. However, the Congress Street alternatives would have their northern station under Haymarket Square rather than under the existing North Station; this would allow for a Blue Line connection at State rather than Aquarium.
