= Tashmoo Springs Pumping Station =

- U.S. National Register of Historic Places
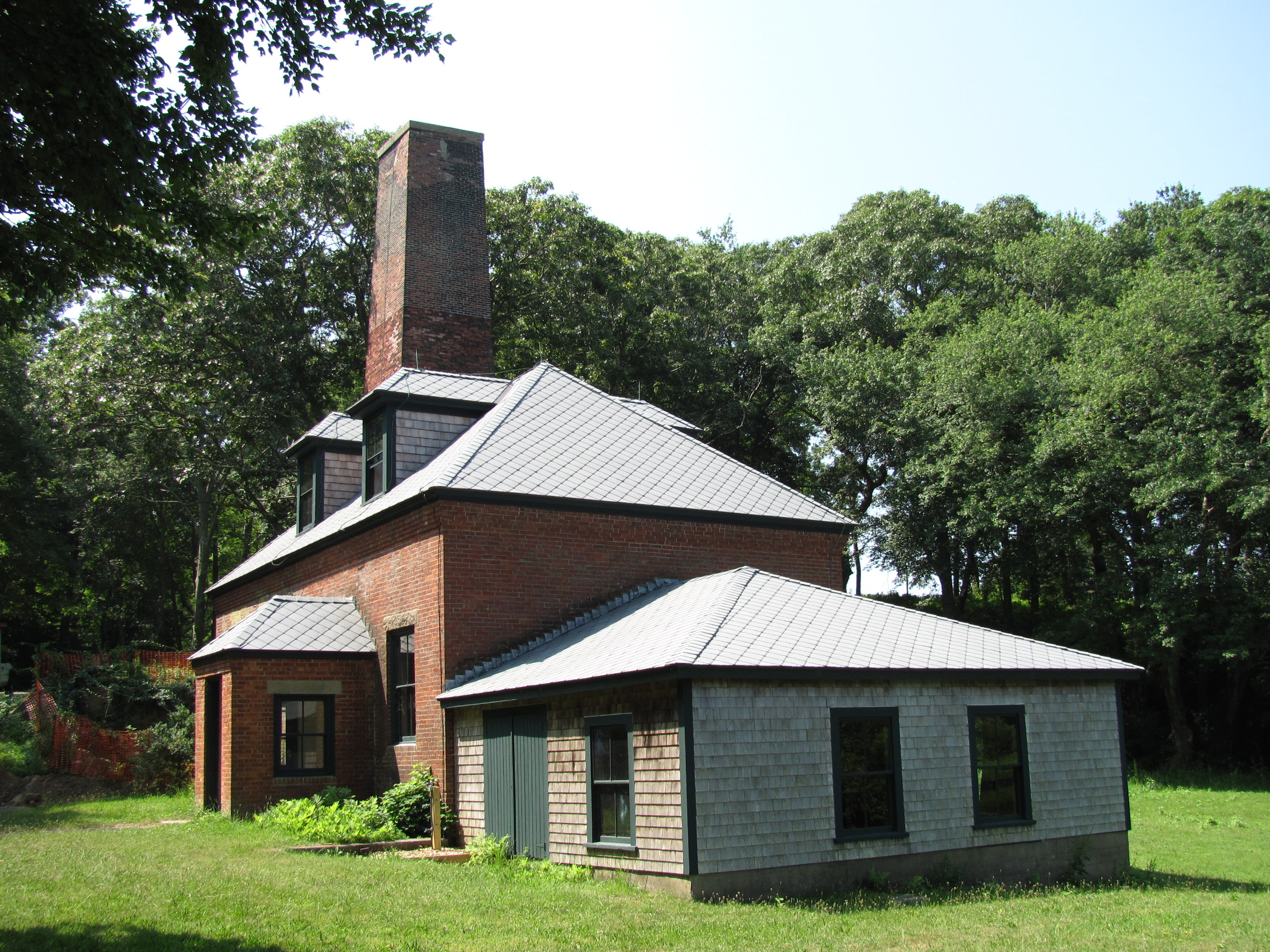
- The main pump house

- Location within Massachusetts Location within the United States
- Location: Tisbury, Massachusetts
- Coordinates: 41°26′54″N 70°37′19.4″W
- Built: 1870
- NRHP reference No.: 08001126
- Added to NRHP: December 3, 2008

The Tashmoo Springs Pumping Station is a historic waterworks facility in Tisbury, Massachusetts, on the island of Martha's Vineyard. The pump station and associated works were first constructed by private interests in the 1880s to provide a reliable water supply for the burgeoning resort areas of Tisbury as well as the port of Vineyard Haven. The facilities were taken over by the town in the early 20th century, after which some alterations were made to accommodate technological improvements. Following a series of hurricanes in the mid-20th century, which highlighted the risks of the station's location and ability to provide reliable drinking water, the town abandoned the facility. Since then it has been largely abandoned, although it was used in the 1990s by a bottled water interest, and some work has been done to preserve the Late Victorian main pumping station building.

== History ==
The town of Tisbury, Massachusetts occupies the West Chop portion of the island of Martha's Vineyard. It is separated from neighboring West Tisbury by a line including Lake Tashmoo, a saltwater lake on the western side of the chop, and a freshwater spring that fed the lake. The Tisbury area was settled in the 17th century, and has since then been home to the island's major port, Vineyard Haven.

The northern reaches of West Chop were used for agriculture well into the 19th century. Interest in developing the area as a summer resort began in the 1870s with several failed proposals, but began in a serious way in the 1880s with the establishment of the West Chop Land Company. Financial interests in that company, seeking a reliable water supply for the growing development, formed the Vineyard Haven Water Company in 1886. This company purchased 30 acres (12 ha) of land, including Tashmoo Spring and lakefront on Lake Tashmoo, and in 1887 constructed a steam-powered pumping station at a cost of $48.300. It was the island's first water pumping station.

The pumping station was powered by two steam engines, and drew water from the lake. It was delivered by a series of pipes to the new development at West Chop, and to Vineyard Haven, where it supplied water for a few fire hydrants and private homes. It was relatively quickly found to be inadequate for the needs of water supply and of fire prevention, and the private company was criticized for its high rates. The town took over the facility from the company in 1905 by eminent domain.

Between 1905 and 1931 the town expanded the capacity of the system, and introduced new technology to improve its reliability, building an addition onto the main station in 1907. The facility was converted from steam power to electricity in 1919, necessitating further alterations to the plant to accommodate new equipment.

In 1932, a major hurricane breached the sandbar that separates Lake Tashmoo from the Atlantic Ocean. This increased the salinity of the water in the lake, and highlighted to the town the risks of the facility's location to its water supply. It consequently constructed a dike to isolate a portion of upper end of the lake from saltwater incursion. This dike was breached by a hurricane in 1944, introducing salt water into the station's intake well. Hurricane Carol in 1954 swamped the pumphouse, disabling the equipment. By this time the town had already begun seeking alternatives to the Tashmoo Spring supply, and a new well was able to supply the town during the outage. The town stopped using the Tashmoo Spring facility as its primary water supply in 1971.

After that the facilities fell into decline. They were briefly revived in the 1980s by a private interest that sold Tashmoo Spring Bottled Water until 1999. The town has since then taken steps to restore the main pumping station's roof, and has placed a preservation restriction on the building. 17 acres (6.9 ha) of land area, encompassing the surviving elements of the water works, were listed on the National Register of Historic Places in 2008.

== See also ==
- National Register of Historic Places listings in Dukes County, Massachusetts
