= West Chop Club Historic District =

Historic district in Massachusetts, United States

- U.S. National Register of Historic Places
- U.S. Historic district
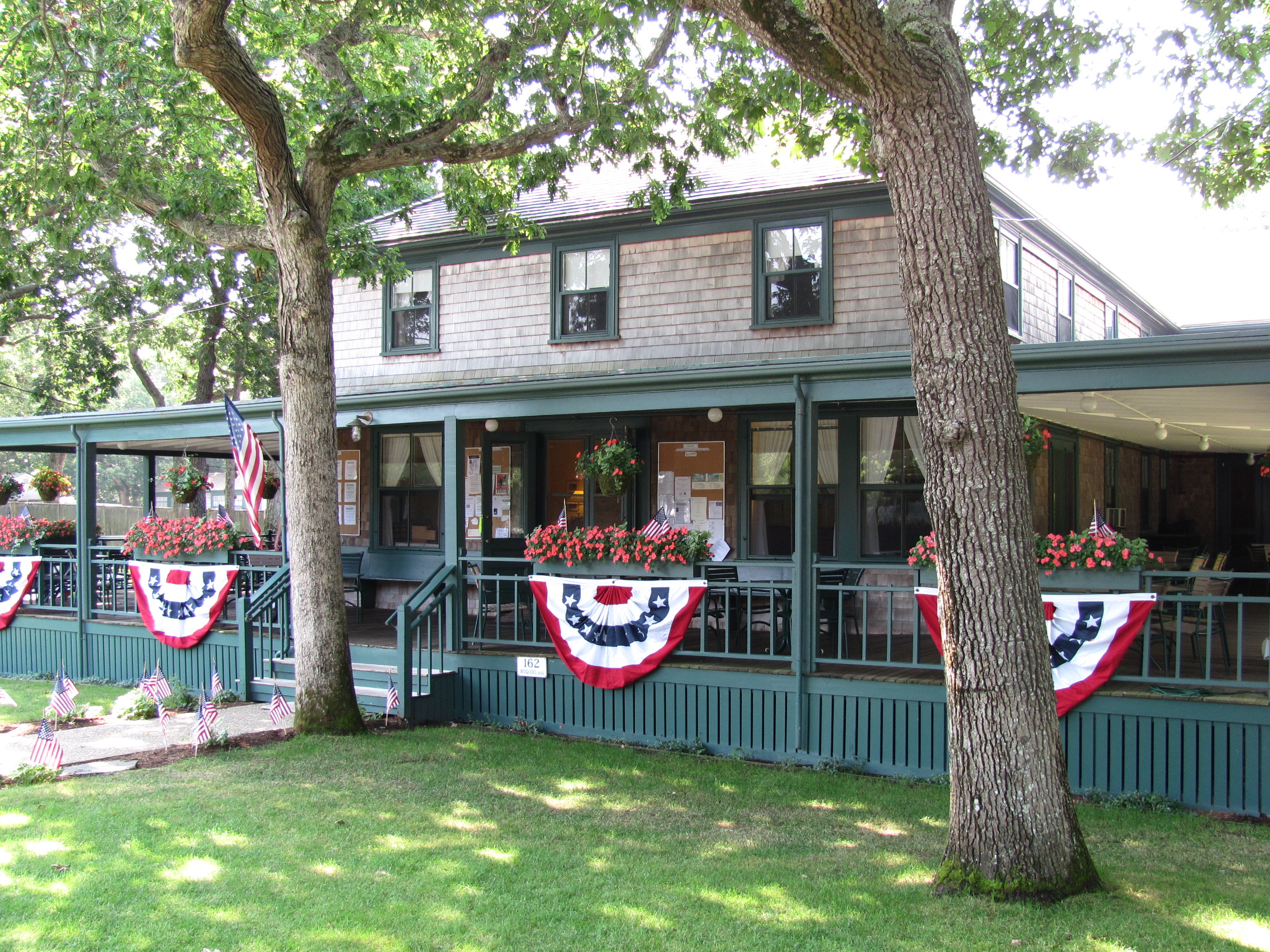
- West Chop Club

- Location within Massachusetts Location within the United States
- Location: Tisbury, Massachusetts
- Built: 1887
- Architect: Tallant, Hugh
- Architectural style: Shingle Style, Tudor Revival
- NRHP reference No.: 07001104
- Added to NRHP: October 18, 2007

The West Chop Club Historic District is a historic district in Tisbury, Massachusetts, on the island of Martha's Vineyard. The district represents a well-preserved planned summer resort community of the late 19th century. Located in and around Iroquois Avenue, the district encompasses the northernmost portion of West Chop, a peninsula that separates Vineyard Sound and the sheltered waters of Vineyard Haven Harbor, an area that was developed by the West Chop Land Company in the 1880s. The land is now owned by the West Chop Land Trust and managed by the private West Chop Club. The district was listed on the National Register of Historic Places in 2007.

== History ==
For most of the colonial period, the West Chop area of Martha's Vineyard saw agricultural uses. These uses continued into the 19th century, primarily because the northern reaches of the point were held by a single landowner. West Chop Light was built in the area in 1817, and a Methodist summer camp meeting was held near the lighthouse in 1827.

The area's rural character began to change in the 1870s with the rise of summer resort communities on the island. An initial attempt at development failed in the 1870s, but in the 1880s the West Chop Land Company began development of the area. The company laid out narrow winding roads. The company built a wharf, developed a stretch of beach for public use, and sold plots of land for development as summer cottages. In 1892 the company built the West Chop Inn. It built a clubhouse and cottages that it rented out, and also constructed two tennis courts for the use of its clients.

By 1900 the resort community had grown to include two hotels, a post office, grocery store, and a variety of recreational facilities. The West Chop Land Company went bankrupt in 1911. The owners of the houses in the community banded together to form the West Chop Land Trust, which acquired the Land Company properties. The privately held West Chop Club was organized in the 1960s to manage the properties owned by the Trust.

== District elements ==
The historic district was listed on the National Register of Historic Places in 2007. It encompasses about 17 acres (6.9 ha), and includes five buildings and four structures:

- The Cedars, a large Shingle-style building at Main and Iroquois
- The Cottage, located directly east of The Cedars, is a simple rectangular single-story Shingle style building
- The Casino, a large two-story building across from the West Chop Inn
- The West Chop Inn, on Iroquois Street, a large T-shaped Shingle-style building
- The West Chop Post Office, a white 1 1/2-story building which used to have its own zip code (02573)
- The "Big Pier", built in 1888, juts into the Vineyard Sound
- The Jetty, built in the first half of the 20th century, separates Vineyard Haven Harbor from Vineyard Sound, and marks the eastern end of the club's waterfront
- Two clay tennis courts, built c. 1911, are located next to the West Chop Inn

The district boundaries include the following non-contributing properties:

- Two modern concrete tennis courts
- A playground
- A flagpole (a modern replacement for older wooden ones), and two nearby benches

== See also ==
- National Register of Historic Places listings in Dukes County, Massachusetts
