= William Street Historic District =

Historic district in Massachusetts, United States

- U.S. National Register of Historic Places
- U.S. Historic district
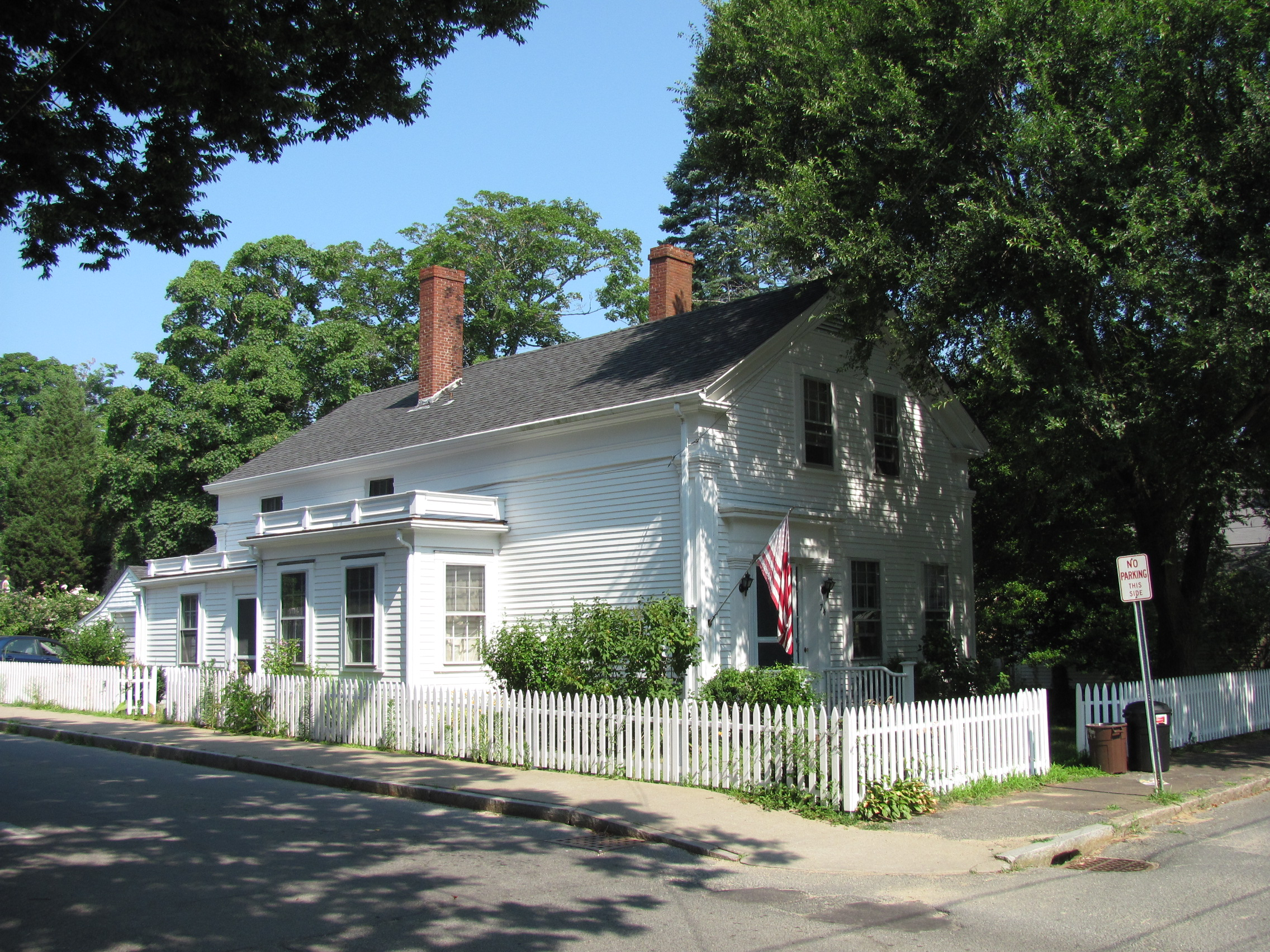
- A house on William Street

- Location within Massachusetts Location within the United States
- Location: Tisbury, Massachusetts
- Coordinates: 41°27′25″N 70°36′24″W
- Architect: Woodbury & Stuart; Norton, James
- Architectural style: Greek Revival, Late Victorian
- NRHP reference No.: 83000571
- Added to NRHP: January 27, 1983

The William Street Historic District is a historic district in Vineyard Haven, Massachusetts, on the island of Martha's Vineyard. The district includes houses on William Street from Woodlawn Avenue in the north to several houses south of Camp Street. It represents the single best preserved area of mid 19th century houses in Vineyard Haven.

== History ==
One of the earliest English settlements on the island of Martha's Vineyard (now in Massachusetts) was a place called Holmes Hole. Eventually incorporated as part of the larger town of Tisbury, Holmes Hole was eventually renamed Vineyard Haven, reflecting its status as the island's major port.

Williams Street was the second street of note laid out in the town, running parallel to Main Street. The street was developed by Thomas Bradley, who also counted a mill in West Tisbury among his businesses. Laid out in 1831, a series of houses were constructed along the road between 1830 and 1860, most in the Greek Revival style. These houses were all built by local builders, apparently without the benefit of architectural guidance. Most of the houses have not had significant alterations, and some continue to be owned by descendants of the original purchasers. The first houses built were typically 1 1/2-story structures with 4 windows.

The historic district encompasses all of the properties from Woodlawn Avenue in the north to Camp Street, extending about three houses south of the latter. There are only a few modern houses in this stretch, as well as an old schoolhouse. The district was listed on the National Register of Historic Places in 1983.

== See also ==
- National Register of Historic Places listings in Dukes County, Massachusetts
