= Craigville Historic District =

Historic district in Massachusetts, United States

- U.S. National Register of Historic Places
- U.S. Historic district
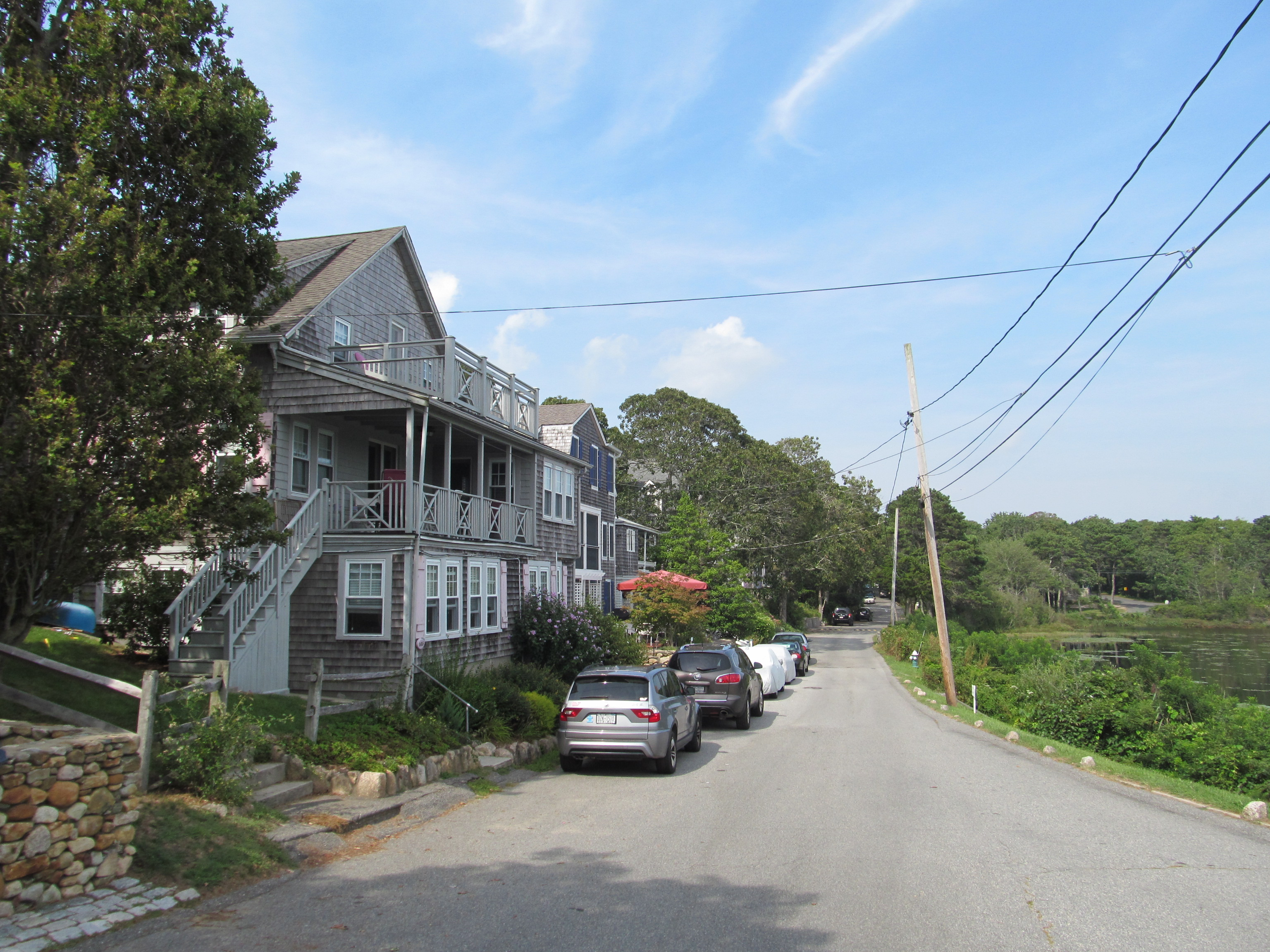
- Lake Elizabeth Drive

- Location within Cape Cod Location within Massachusetts Location within the United States
- Location: Barnstable, Massachusetts
- Coordinates: 41°38′29″N 70°19′58″W
- Built: 1872
- MPS: Barnstable MRA
- NRHP reference No.: 87000275
- Added to NRHP: November 10, 1987

The Craigville Historic District encompasses a historic religious camp meeting area in the Craigville section of Barnstable, Massachusetts, United States. It is centered on the junction of Lake Elizabeth Drive and Ocean Avenue, just west of Lake Elizabeth. The camp meeting was established in 1871 by the New England Convention of Christian Churches on land that was purchased from members of the Perry family. Along the grid of roads south of the main junction, gingerbread-decorated Gothic cottages were built over the following decades. The main tabernacle, an open-walled church, was built in 1887. The district was listed on the National Register of Historic Places in 1987.

== Description and history ==
Craigville is located in southern Barnstable, between the villages of Centerville and Hyannisport. The historic district encompasses the original core of a religious camp meeting area established in 1871 on what was before then called "Strawberry Hill" and became known thereafter as "Christian Hill". Originally called "Camp Christian", the area quickly developed, with a store and post office (both built 1872-73), and an inn (1874). It was renamed Craigville in 1881 after the death of Dr. J. Austin Craig. The camp's central feature, its tabernacle, was originally a large tent with a capacity of 600 worshippers, which assumed its more permanent framing and elements in 1887. The area around the tabernacle was subdivided into small parcels, on which campers erected temporary, and eventually permanent structures. This pattern of development was similar to camp meetings established earlier, including ones at Yarmouth and Martha's Vineyard.

Architecturally, the Craigville camp meeting's buildings are predominantly Carpenter Gothic in style, a favorite in numerous other camp meeting grounds. By the end of the 1870s more than thirty cottages had been built and sold, and the number grew into the 1930s. Alpha Cottage is a typical early structure, 1-1/2 stories in height, with a flushboarded facade with carved vergeboard and balcony trim. The post office and store, both built in 1872-73, are relatively plain vernacular commercial buildings, as is the 1874 Craigville Inn.

The historic district is bounded on the north by the tabernacle property, which is just north of the junction of Lake Elizabeth Drive and Ocean Avenue. The other public buildings are located on the east side of Lake Elizabeth Drive, just south of that junction, and the cottages included in the district line Laurel, Valley, and Ocean Avenues as far as Hotel Avenue.

== See also ==
- National Register of Historic Places listings in Barnstable County, Massachusetts
