= National Register of Historic Places listings in Dukes County, Massachusetts =

Location of Dukes County in Massachusetts

This is a list of the National Register of Historic Places listings in Dukes County, Massachusetts.

This is intended to be a complete list of the properties and districts on the National Register of Historic Places in Dukes County, Massachusetts, United States. Latitude and longitude coordinates are provided for many National Register properties and districts; these locations may be seen together in a Google map.

There are 23 properties and districts listed on the National Register in the county, which include one National Historic Landmark and one National Historic Landmark District (Wesleyan Grove, which is listed twice in the register under different names).

Contents: Counties in Massachusetts

Barnstable | Berkshire | Bristol | Dukes | Essex | Franklin | Hampden | Hampshire | Middlesex | Nantucket | Norfolk | Plymouth | Suffolk | Worcester

This National Park Service list is complete through NPS recent listings posted May 1, 2026.

== Current listings ==
	Name on the Register	Image	Date listed	Location	City or town	Description
1	The Arcade	The Arcade	August 5, 1994 (#94000813)	31 Circuit Ave. 41°27′21″N 70°33′30″W	Oak Bluffs	Incorrectly listed on National Register at 134 Circuit Ave.
2	Barn House	Barn House	December 15, 2011 (#11000920)	451 South Rd. 41°20′36″N 70°43′58″W	Chilmark	
3	Cape Poge Light	Cape Poge Light	September 28, 1987 (#87002040)	Chappaquiddick Island; 41°25′12″N 70°27′10″W	Edgartown	
4	East Chop Light	East Chop Light	June 15, 1987 (#87001480)	Lighthouse Rd. 41°27′59″N 70°34′16″W	Oak Bluffs	
5	Edgartown Harbor Light	Edgartown Harbor Light	June 15, 1987 (#87001465)	Off N. Water St. 41°23′33″N 70°30′21″W	Edgartown	
6	Edgartown Village Historic District	Edgartown Village Historic District	December 9, 1983 (#83003967)	Bounded by Water St. (North and South) and Pease's Point Way(North and South); 41°23′25″N 70°30′45″W	Edgartown	
7	Flying Horses	Flying Horses	August 27, 1979 (#79000342)	33 Oak Bluffs Ave. 41°27′26″N 70°33′28″W	Oak Bluffs	National Historic Landmark
8	Gay Head-Aquinnah Town Center Historic District	Gay Head-Aquinnah Town Center Historic District	February 26, 1999 (#99000187)	South Rd. and Church St. 41°20′31″N 70°48′50″W	Aquinnah	Municipal and ecclesiastical buildings in Aquinnah's historic town center.
9	Gay Head-Aquinnah Light	Gay Head-Aquinnah Light	June 15, 1987 (#87001464)	Lighthouse Rd. 41°21′02″N 70°50′18″W	Aquinnah	1856 lighthouse, near site of oldest (1799) lighthouse on Martha's Vineyard.
10	Polly Hill Arboretum Historic District	Polly Hill Arboretum Historic District	June 15, 2015 (#15000350)	795-833 State Rd. 41°23′51″N 70°40′50″W	West Tisbury	
11	Martha's Vineyard Campground	Martha's Vineyard Campground	December 14, 1978 (#78000439)	Roughly bounded by Cottage Park, Quequechan, Clinton, Dukes, County, Siloam, Lake, and Central Aves. 41°27′19″N 70°33′41″W	Oak Bluffs	Duplicate of Wesleyan Grove
12	Old Mill	Old Mill	March 29, 1984 (#84002303)	Edgartown-West Tisbury Rd. 41°22′55″N 70°40′20″W	West Tisbury	
13	Ritter House	Ritter House	December 6, 1977 (#77000169)	Beach St. 41°27′14″N 70°36′10″W	Vineyard Haven	
14	Tarpaulin Cove Light	Tarpaulin Cove Light	June 15, 1987 (#87001505)	Naushon Island; 41°28′07″N 70°45′28″W	Gosnold	
15	Tashmoo Springs Pumping Station	Tashmoo Springs Pumping Station	December 3, 2008 (#08001126)	325 W. Spring St. 41°26′54″N 70°37′19″W	Tisbury	
16	Dr. Harrison A. Tucker Cottage	Dr. Harrison A. Tucker Cottage	October 22, 1990 (#90000678)	61 Ocean Ave. 41°27′20″N 70°33′28″W	Oak Bluffs	
17	Union Chapel	Union Chapel	June 7, 1990 (#90000677)	Bounded by Circuit, Kennebec, and Narragansett Aves. and Grove St. 41°27′16″N 70°33′31″W	Oak Bluffs	
18	U.S. Marine Hospital at Vineyard Haven		February 29, 2024 (#100009983)	151 Lagoon Pond Road; 41°26′57″N 70°35′59″W	Tisbury	
19	Edwin DeVries Vanderhoop Homestead	Edwin DeVries Vanderhoop Homestead	September 6, 2006 (#06000784)	35 South Rd. 41°20′43″N 70°50′09″W	Aquinnah	A 19th century Wampanoag homestead, now home to the Aquinnah Cultural Center.
20	Wesleyan Grove	Wesleyan Grove	April 5, 2005 (#05000458)	Martha's Vineyard; 41°27′23″N 70°33′34″W	Oak Bluffs	Duplicate of Martha's Vineyard Campground
21	West Chop Club Historic District	West Chop Club Historic District	October 18, 2007 (#07001104)	Iroquois Ave. 41°28′47″N 70°36′15″W	Tisbury	
22	West Chop Light Station	West Chop Light Station	June 15, 1987 (#87001506)	W. Chop Rd. 41°28′55″N 70°36′14″W	Tisbury	
23	William Street Historic District	William Street Historic District	January 27, 1983 (#83000571)	Williams St. from Wood Lawn Ave. to 24 Williams St. 41°27′25″N 70°36′24″W	Tisbury	

== See also ==
- List of National Historic Landmarks in Massachusetts
- National Register of Historic Places listings in Massachusetts
