= Union Chapel (Oak Bluffs, Massachusetts) =

Historic church in Massachusetts, United States

- U.S. National Register of Historic Places
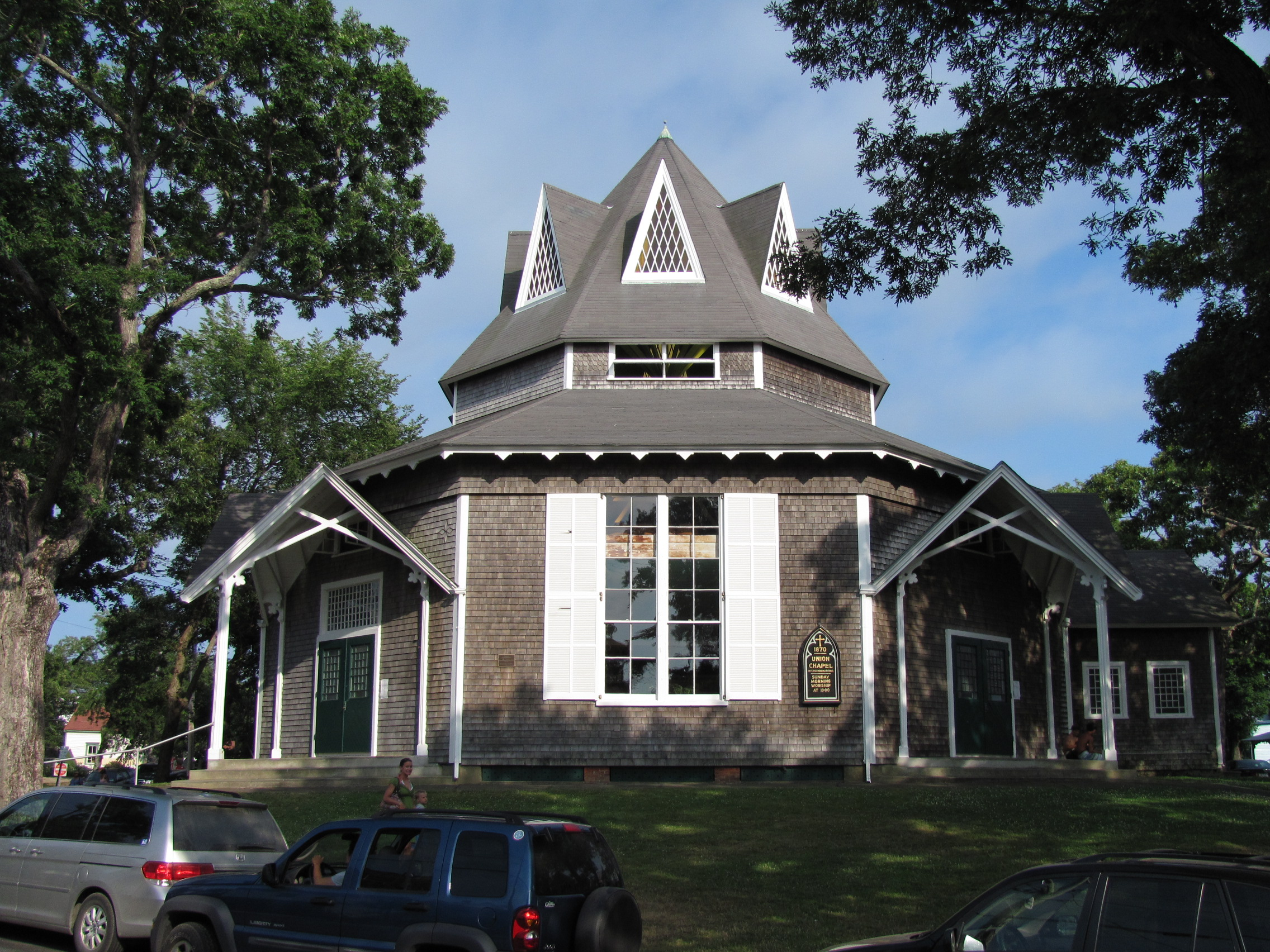
- Union Chapel

- Location within Massachusetts Location within the United States
- Location: Oak Bluffs, Massachusetts
- Coordinates: 41°27′16″N 70°33′31″W
- Built: 1870
- Architect: Samuel Freeman Pratt
- Architectural style: Stick/Eastlake, Octagon Mode
- NRHP reference No.: 90000677
- Added to NRHP: June 7, 1990

Union Chapel (or the Oak Bluffs Christian Union Chapel) is an historic octagon-shaped church building in Oak Bluffs, on Martha's Vineyard, Massachusetts. The church was built in 1870 as a non-sectarian worship space in an area dominated by the Methodist summer camp meeting known as Wesleyan Grove. Acquired in 2002 by the nonprofit Martha's Vineyard Preservation Trust, the building continues to be used for non-sectarian religious services, and also serves as a community center and performing arts space.

== History ==
The area now called Oak Bluffs, Massachusetts on the island of Martha's Vineyard began to develop in the 1830s with the establishment of a Methodist summer camp meeting which became known as Wesleyan Grove. The popularity of the camp prompted the formation of the Oak Bluffs Land and Wharf Company to develop areas adjacent to the camp as a resort area.

The chapel was built in 1870 as a non-denominational house of worship for vacationers who were not Methodist. The church, an eight-sided structure with an open internal plan, was designed by local architect Samuel Freeman Pratt, whose work for the Company included its headquarters building.

The church was listed on the National Register of Historic Places on June 7, 1990. In 2002 the building was acquired by the Martha's Vineyard Preservation Trust. The building continues to be used for services on a seasonal basis, and is also used for community events and as a performing arts space.

== See also ==
- National Register of Historic Places listings in Dukes County, Massachusetts
- List of octagonal buildings and structures in the United States
