= Ritter House =

Historic house in Massachusetts, United States

- U.S. National Register of Historic Places
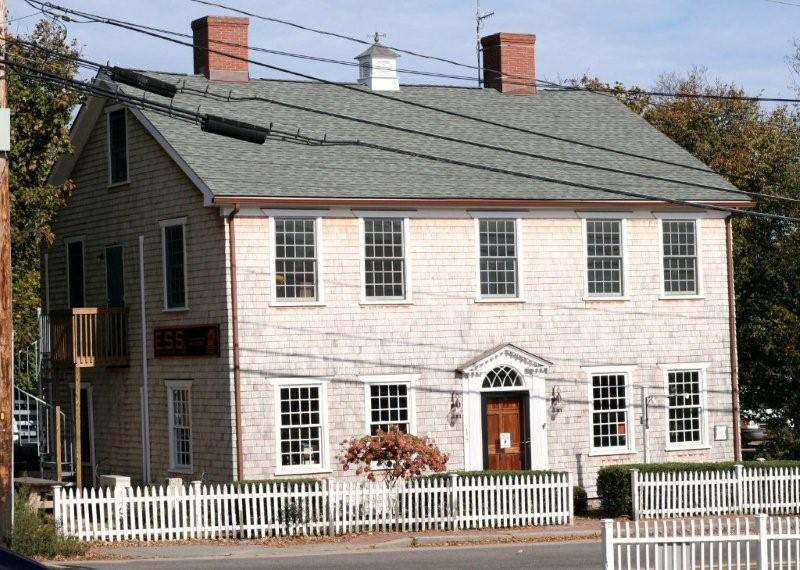

- Location within Massachusetts Location within the United States
- Location: Vineyard Haven, Massachusetts
- Coordinates: 41°27′14″N 70°36′10″W
- Built: 1796
- Architectural style: Federal
- NRHP reference No.: 77000169
- Added to NRHP: December 6, 1977

The Ritter House (also the Jirah Luce House) is an historic house on Beach Street in Vineyard Haven, Massachusetts, USA, and is listed on the National Register of Historic Places. The house is one of the few remaining Federal period buildings in Vineyard Haven. It has had a succession of occupants and uses, and as of 2007 served as a retail establishment.

== History ==
The house was built in 1796 on what was then known as “Quality Street“, next to the Mansion House hotel in Vineyard Haven, Massachusetts, the main port of the island of Martha's Vineyard. Originally built by Jirah Luce, it was occupied early by the highly respected Connecticut physician Dr. Rufus Spaulding (1760–1830) until about 1812, when he returned to his home state. Dr. Spaulding ran the house as an inn, and Spaulding himself was described by historian Charles Banks as "doctor, postmaster, justice, village librarian, inn-keeper, and Master of the lodge of Masons." Other sources note that this house was at one time a tavern, and later became the first post office and library in the town of Tisbury. The house was inherited by Dr. Spaulding's daughter Sophronia and her husband, Thomas West.

Another early resident was Stephen deNeuville (1778–1816), aka "Stephen New", a young French sea-captain. The house was inherited by his daughter Hannah Chase DeNeuville and her husband Orrick Peck Branscomb (1809–1859), a shoemaker and general store owner who moved to the island from Maine in the early 1830s. This house is often referred to as the “Branscomb House” in many older references. The house barely survived a major fire in 1883, which destroyed the entire downtown portion of Vineyard Haven right to the edge of this property.

Retired whaling captain Gilbert L. Smith (1832–1928) bought the house in 1902. Mr. & Mrs. Henry A. Ritter purchased the house in the early 1900s. Henry Ritter was principal of the Tisbury School for many years and was remembered as an excellent teacher but a stern schoolmaster. By the 1920s the home was owned by Mrs. Evangeline Merrill Ritter, known to many as "the Vineyard Weaver."

The Ritter House was purchased by the Martha's Vineyard Historical Preservation Society in 1976, and was listed on the National Register of Historic Places in 1977. From 1981 to 1988 the Society rented the house out to the Tisbury Museum. The Museum merged with the Dukes County Historical Society in that year, and the Society undertook a restoration of the property. It has since been converted to a retail property.

== See also ==
- National Register of Historic Places listings in Dukes County, Massachusetts
