= Dr. Harrison A. Tucker Cottage =

Historic house in Massachusetts, United States

- U.S. National Register of Historic Places
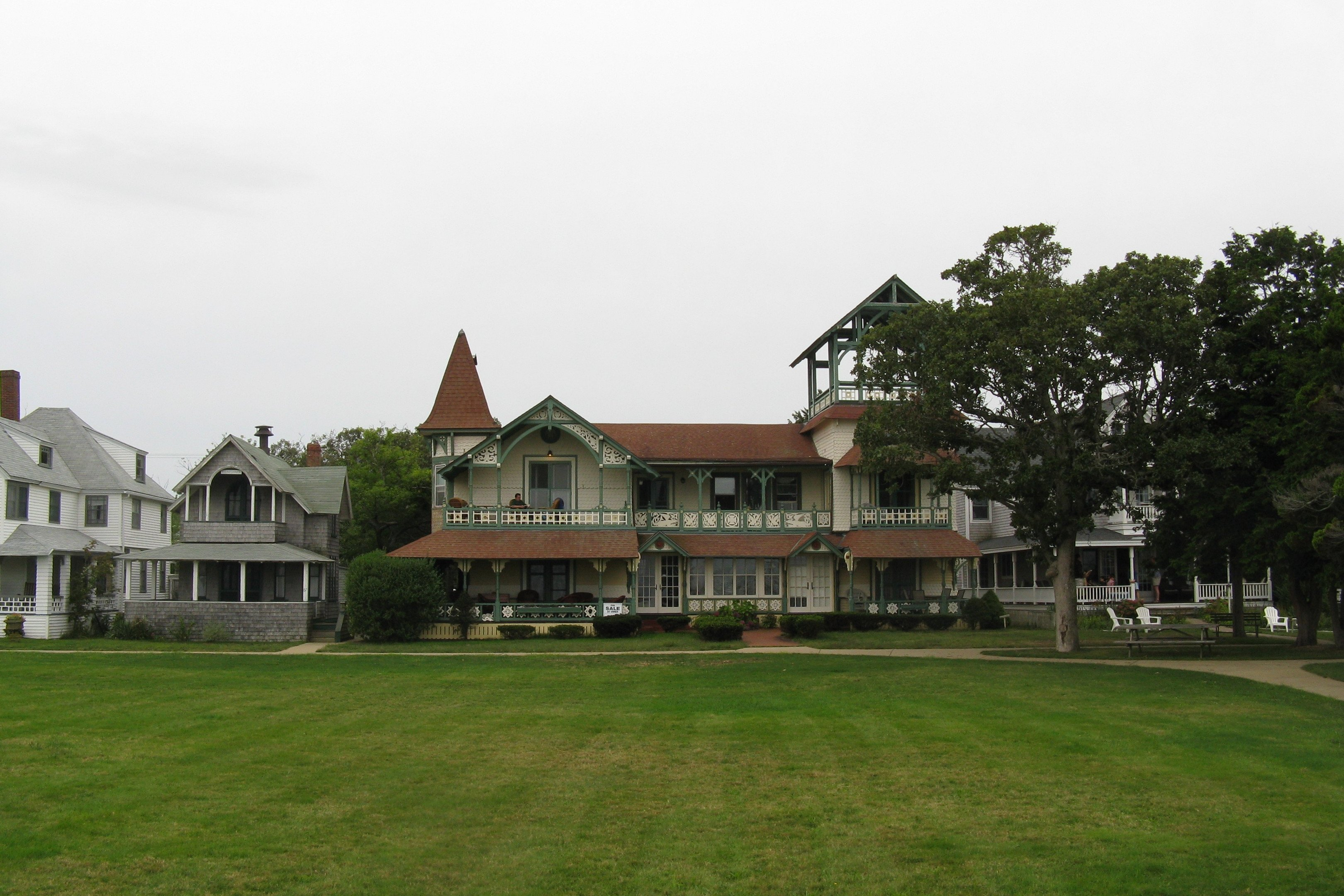

- Location within Massachusetts Location within the United States
- Location: Oak Bluffs, Massachusetts
- Coordinates: 41°27′20″N 70°33′28″W
- Built: 1872
- Architect: Hammond, John S. Hartwell & Swasey
- Architectural style: Queen Anne
- NRHP reference No.: 90000678
- Added to NRHP: October 22, 1990

The Dr. Harrison A. Tucker Cottage is a historic summer cottage at 61 Ocean Avenue in Oak Bluffs, Massachusetts. The cottage took shape in the 1870s as a combination of several smaller structures that were joined by an addition. Doctor Tucker was a resident of Cottage City, as Oak Bluffs was then known, and invited Ulysses S. Grant during his time there. Tucker was also a leading figure in the Oak Bluffs Land and Wharf Company, which spearheaded development of the town outside the Methodist meeting camp known as Wesleyan Grove. The house was listed on the National Register of Historic Places in 1990, for its association with Dr. Tucker, and as one of the most elaborate Victorian houses in the town.

== Description ==
The Tucker Cottage is set on Ocean Avenue, a curving street which overlooks Ocean Park and Nantucket Sound. It is part of a neighborhood of large 19th-century summer cottages which are laid out on concentric roads arrayed around Ocean Park, a seven-acre park. Ocean Avenue is the innermost of these roads, directly abutting the park.

Dr. Tucker was a Massachusetts native who made his fortune in the production and sale of patent medicines, and had been vacationing at Oak Bluffs for several years before he built his cottage in 1872. He was a major social force in the summer life of Oak Bluffs, was a cofounder of its Trinity Episcopal Church, and may have paid for the bandstand visible from his cottage. The cottage was originally in Stick style, and was designed by Hartwell and Swasey, but little is known of the original design, for the cottage was extensively remodeled in 1877 to designs by John Hammond, giving it its present Queen Anne styling.

The cottage has an asymmetrical T shape with irregular massing. It is predominantly plank-framed, and has a variety of porches and belvederes; its most prominent feature is the tower at its northwest corner, which is 46 feet (14 m) high. Each of the tower's three levels has a porch with Stick-style balustrade, and the tower is topped by an open gabled roof with more Stick decoration. The central portion of the main facade is recessed from the tower, with a porch on the second floor above a first floor with a truncated overhanging roof line. The left (south) side of the main facade has a projecting gable section with porches above and below, and a small turret-topped side projection immediately behind it. The tower was destroyed during the New England Hurricane of 1938, and rebuilt in the 1980s. The exterior decorations include numerous wood carvings, including depictions of lion heads, doves, dragons, and falcons.

== See also ==
- National Register of Historic Places listings in Dukes County, Massachusetts
