= Gay Head–Aquinnah Town Center Historic District =

Historic district in Massachusetts, United States

- U.S. National Register of Historic Places
- U.S. Historic district
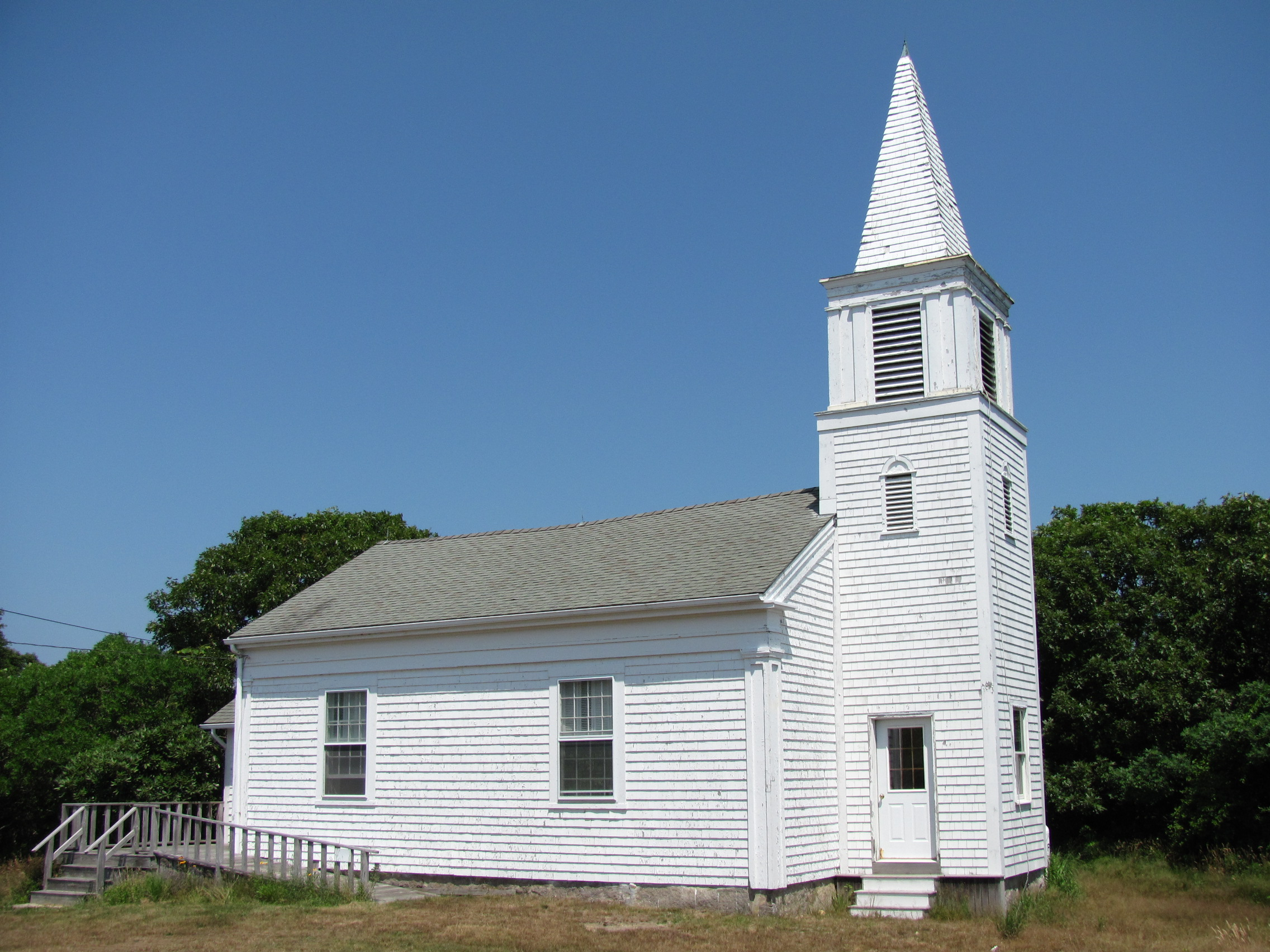
- Gay Head Community Baptist Church

- Location within Massachusetts
- Location: Aquinnah, Massachusetts, United States
- Coordinates: 41°20′31″N 70°48′50″W
- Built: 1832 (194 years ago)
- Architect: Hancock, Herbert C.; Millman, Lester J.
- Architectural style: Greek Revival, Bungalow/Craftsman
- NRHP reference No.: 99000187
- Added to NRHP: February 26, 1999 (27 years ago)

The Gay Head–Aquinnah Town Center Historic District is a historic district encompassing the center of the American town of Aquinnah, Massachusetts. The district includes six contributing buildings and two monuments, based around the intersection of South and Church Streets in Aquinnah.

== History ==
Prior to the arrival of English colonists, the island of Martha's Vineyard was occupied by Wampanoag Indians. English settlement began in the 1640s in the eastern part of the island, and the Gay Head area in the far west remained reserved to the natives. Following American independence in 1783, the Wampanoags became de facto wards of the state, but their lands at Gay Head remained under their control.

By the first decades of the 19th century, there were two church congregations, and a school in the area. The church congregations declined in size, and were eventually absorbed into that of nearby Holmes Hole (present-day Vineyard Haven).

In the early 1830s, a town center began to take shape along Old South Road. The Gay Head congregants organized a new church in 1832, which met in the schoolhouse. It is unclear whether this refers to the schoolhouse in the district, whose existence is only definitely dated to 1844. The small congregation received a donation for the construction of a new church, which was dedicated in December 1850.

The town of Gay Head was incorporated in 1870; it was renamed Aquinnah in 1998.

A new town center began to take shape following incorporation, and the surveying and construction of what is now South Road. By 1907, the church, school and parsonage house had all been relocated to their present setting near the intersection of South and Church Roads.s To these were added the present town hall, and a post office with residence for the postmaster.

== District elements ==
The district was added to the National Register of Historic Places in 1999. It includes the following six contributing buildings:

- a schoolhouse, known to exist in 1844; this building now serves as the Aquinnah town library
- the Gay Head Community Baptist church, constructed 1850; it is the only church in town
- the minister's parsonage house, constructed 1856
- the town hall, constructed 1929
- the former post office and residence, constructed in the 1920s
- a small outhouse on the church property, not used in living memory

Two monuments, commemorating the town's contributions to World War I, are also contributing elements to the district. Non-contributing elements include the modern town office building and the Gay Head Fire Station.

== See also ==
- National Register of Historic Places listings in Dukes County, Massachusetts
