= West Chop Light =

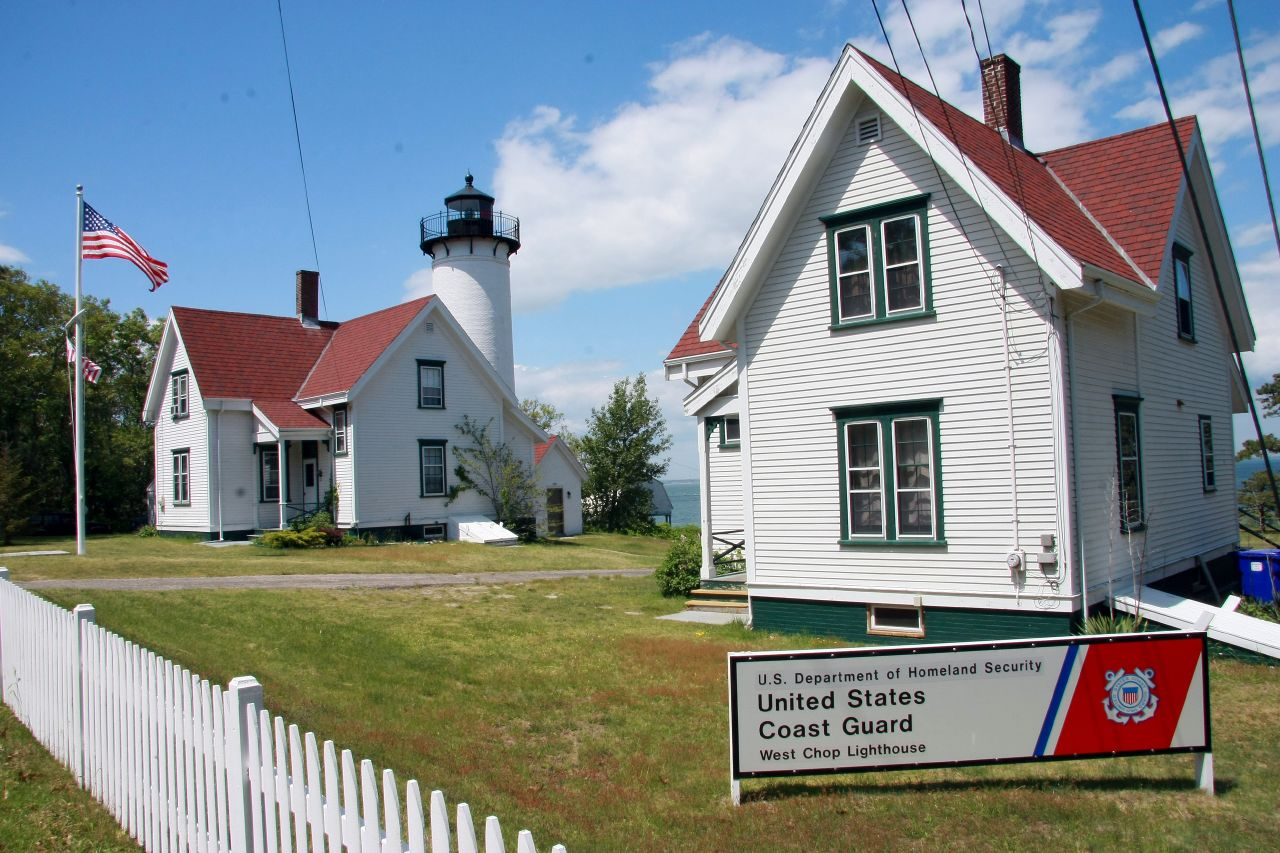
- Location: Tisbury, Massachusetts
- Coordinates: 41°28′50.87″N 70°35′59.21″W

Tower
- Constructed: 1891
- Construction: brick
- Automated: 1976
- Height: 45 feet (14 m)
- Shape: Conical tower
- Markings: White
- Heritage: National Register of Historic Places listed place
- Fog signal: Horn: 1 every 30s

Light
- Focal height: 84 feet (26 m)
- Range: white 14 nautical miles (26 km; 16 mi), red 10 nautical miles (19 km; 12 mi)
- Characteristic: Occulting white, 4s, red sector
- West Chop Light Station
- U.S. National Register of Historic Places
- Area: 4 acres (1.6 ha)
- Built: 1881
- MPS: Lighthouses of Massachusetts TR
- NRHP reference No.: 87001506
- Added to NRHP: June 15, 1987

West Chop Light is a lighthouse station located at the entrance of Vineyard Haven Harbor in Tisbury, Massachusetts, on the northern tip of West Chop, a few miles from the village of Vineyard Haven.

The first 25-foot (7.6 m) rubblestone lighthouse and dwelling were built on the bluffs of West Chop in 1817. Following constant erosion, the lighthouse was moved back in 1830, and again in 1846.

The first lightkeeper was pilot James Shaw West who tended the light for thirty years, from 1818 to 1848. His pay was $350 a year. Subsequent lightkeepers were Charles West, 1849–1868; his son Charles P. West, 1869-c1909; George F. Dolby (1909–1919); James Yates (1919-?); and Octave Ponsart (1946–1956) Sam Fuller has also been mentioned as a lightkeeper.

The present 45-foot (14 m) tall brick tower and dwelling were built in 1891. In 1976 West Chop Light became the last Martha's Vineyard lighthouse to be automated, but the original Fresnel lens is still in operation. The former lightkeeper's dwellings are now vacant but remains property of the U.S. Coast Guard and off limits to the public.

The West Chop Light Station has been on the National Park Service's National Register of Historic Places since 1987.

== First lightkeeper ==
Captain James Shaw West (1777–1859), the first lightkeeper, was born December 11, 1777, in Tisbury, Massachusetts, the eldest son of Captain Jeruel West and Deborah Shaw of Frog Alley, Tisbury. He was married to Charlotte Hammond (1781–1849) of Falmouth, Massachusetts. West was listed in the records first as a "mariner" and later as a "pilot." He and his wife first lived in the area of the "Neck" of West Chop which is now Hatch Road.

Shortly after the erection of the first West Chop Light in 1817, they sold this property and presumably moved into the lightkeeper's dwelling adjacent to the lighthouse. (In 1842, they purchased a 30-acre (12 ha) lot known as the "Point Lot" which surrounded the lighthouse property.) West was the lightkeeper of the West Chop Light for thirty years. During his term as lightkeeper, West oversaw the installation of new lamps in 1829, and in 1846 the lighthouse was rebuilt and moved away from the eroding bluffs, and a new dwelling built. (The old dwelling was given to his youngest son Gustavus and moved to Music Street, West Tisbury.)

In late 1847, West bought a home across the street from the Methodist Church in Holmes Hole and the following year retired from his position as lightkeeper and moved to their new home in town. West was about sixty years old upon his retirement. His wife Charlotte died the following year, in 1849. Later records call West variously a "mariner" and a "gentleman." "James Shaw West" was listed as a licensed inn-holder in Holmes Hole and ran the "County House," but it is unclear whether this was lightkeeper James or his eldest son, James Junior. In 1859 James Senior died of "palsy" at the age of 81. His children included Captain Abner West (co-inventor of the Holmes & West Harpoon) and Captain David Porter West (1814–1886) (a whaling captain and a scholar of Japan in the 1850s.)

== See also ==
- National Register of Historic Places listings in Dukes County, Massachusetts
