= Middletown, Massachusetts =

Middletown, Massachusetts may refer to:

Places

- Middleton, Massachusetts in Essex County
- Tisbury, Massachusetts, known as "Middletown" until 1671, in Dukes County
