= East Chop Light =

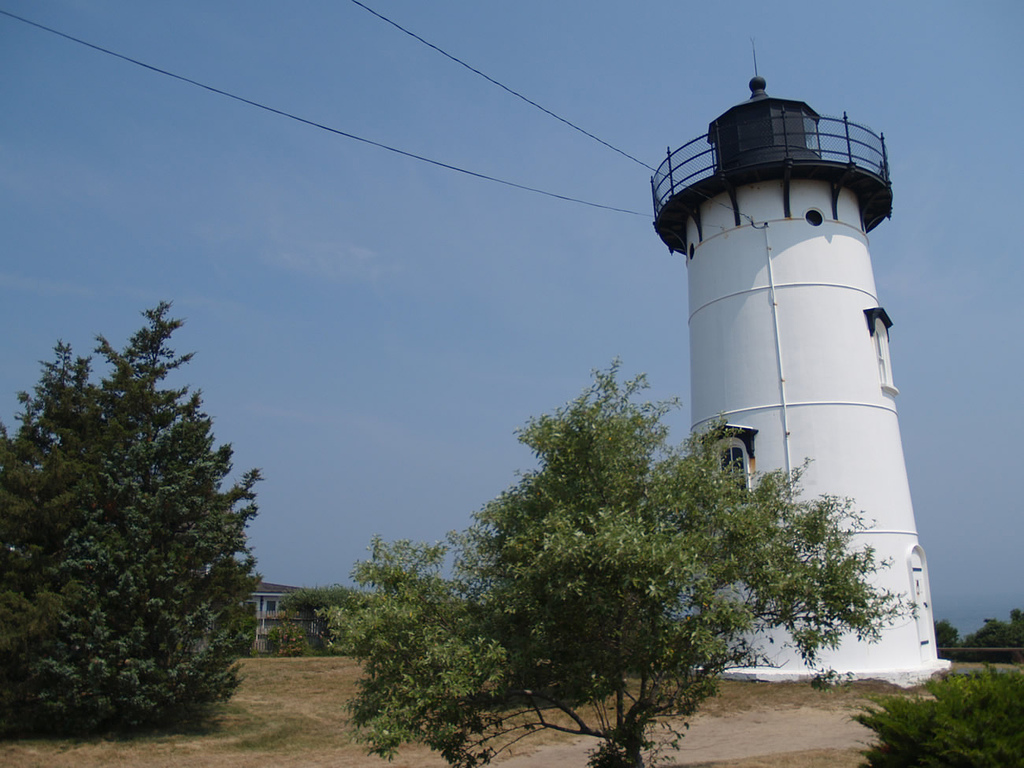
- Location: Lighthouse Road, Oak Bluffs, Massachusetts
- Coordinates: 41°28′12.95″N 70°34′2.825″W

Tower
- Constructed: 1869
- Foundation: Concrete
- Construction: Cast Iron
- Automated: 1933
- Height: 40 feet (12 m)
- Shape: Conical
- Markings: White with black lantern
- Heritage: National Register of Historic Places listed place

Light
- First lit: 1878 (current structure)
- Focal height: 79 feet (24 m)
- Lens: 12 inches (300 mm)
- Range: 9 nautical miles (17 km; 10 mi)
- Characteristic: Isophase Green 6s
- East Chop Light
- U.S. National Register of Historic Places
- Area: 0.1 acres (0.040 ha)
- Built: 1876
- Architectural style: Italianate
- MPS: Lighthouses of Massachusetts TR
- NRHP reference No.: 87001480
- Added to NRHP: June 15, 1987

East Chop Light is a historic lighthouse standing on a bluff overlooking Vineyard Haven Harbor and Vineyard Sound, located along East Chop Drive in the town of Oak Bluffs, Massachusetts. It is one of five lighthouses located on the island of Martha's Vineyard.

== Early history ==
The East Chop Light was built in 1878 and added to the National Register of Historic Places in 1987. In the early 1800s the location was occupied by a semaphore station - thus the origin of the name "Telegraph Hill." Circa 1869 a marine merchant named Captain Silas Daggett constructed a privately owned lighthouse on the property. To pay for construction and maintenance, Daggett collected fees from local merchants, maritime insurance agencies, and ship owners who benefited from the light as an aid-to-navigation. Daggett's 1869 lighthouse was the last of the five lighthouses to be constructed on Martha's Vineyard. The oil-fired East Chop Light burned down in 1871. The light was rebuilt by Daggett in 1872 as a house with a protruding lantern room - similar in concept to the first Edgartown Harbor Light. Daggett's new East Chop Light produced a red signal and had three 21-inch reflectors fueled by kerosene lamps. In 1875, the United States Congress purchased the property for $6,000 and removed the lighthouse and other buildings constructed by Daggett. In 1878 the present day cast-iron conical tower with a fourth-order Fresnel lens was constructed along with an adjacent two-story gabled roof keeper's house. The lighthouse was originally painted white, but was repainted as a brown-red color in the 1880s. The brown-red color was maintained until 1988, when the light was painted white by Vineyard Environmental Research, Institute (VERI). Many people in the East Chop community and elsewhere still harbor fond memories of their "Chocolate Lighthouse." In 1933 the East Chop Light was automated. At the time, the United States Coast Guard (USCG) offered to rent the Keeper's dwelling to longtime keeper, George Walter Purdy. Purdy, who had one arm, served as the East Chop Light's principal keeper for thirty-two years. Purdy refused the offer, and shortly afterwards, the keeper's dwelling, fuel oil shed, and other outbuildings were torn down. Without a keeper on the lighthouse grounds, the USCG closed the East Chop Light to public access.

== Saved from destruction ==
From 1878 through the early 1980s, the East Chop Light was maintained by the United States Coast Guard. Due to U. S. Coast Guard Congressional funding shortages through the 1970s and early 1980s, various lighthouses around the United States were destroyed or designated for destruction. Such designation was due to the high cost of maintaining the structures, and because the lights no longer served as vital aids to navigation. This obsolete status of the lighthouses was facilitated by enhanced satellite GPS and other electrical maritime navigation aids. In fact, according to the 2012 "Doomsday List" published by Lighthouse Digest, there are currently 43 lighthouses in the U.S. listed for destruction in the near future. Due to such funding shortages, the East Chop Light and two other Martha's Vineyard lighthouses (Gay Head Light and Edgartown Harbor Light) were designated for destruction in the early 1980s. These three island lights were saved through federal petition and Congressional testimony of Vineyard Environmental Research, Inst, Founder/President, William Waterway Marks, and, chair, John F. Bitzer, Jr. During and after the Congressional hearings, this effort received support from Congressman Gerry Studds, and Senator Ted Kennedy. Shortly after the Congressional hearings, the United States Coast Guard issued a 35-year license for the three lights to VERI in 1985.

This was the first time in U.S. history that control of "active" lighthouses was transferred to a civilian organization. On similar note, this was the first time in the history of Martha's Vineyard that control of any of its five lighthouses was in the hands of an island organization. After receiving the lighthouse license, the Institute undertook a series of fundraising activities that engaged the community of Martha's Vineyard, including local supporters and celebrities such as board members: Fairleigh S. Dickinson, Jr.; Jonathan Mayhew, whose ancestor's were the Vineyard's first European settlers; Vineyard Gazette co-owner, Jody Reston; philanthropist, Flipper Harris; Margaret K. Littlefield; the actress, Linda Kelsey; WHOI Director, Derek W. Spencer, and John F. Bitzer, Jr. Speakers and performers appearing at these lighthouse events were renowned historian, David McCullough; Senator Ted Kennedy; Caroline Kennedy; Edward M. Kennedy, Jr.; Congressman Gerry Studds; singer/songwriter, Carly Simon; Kate Taylor; Livingston Taylor; Hugh Taylor; Dennis Miller from Saturday Night Live; Bill Styron's wife, Rose Styron - who read one of her original lighthouse poems; United States Navy Rear Admiral, Richard A. Bauman; renowned photographer, Alfred Eisenstaedt and comedian, Steve Sweeney. The proceeds from the lighthouse benefits were applied to a major restoration of the East Chop Light. In 1988, after consultation with the United States Coast Guard and lighthouse restoration experts, VERI changed the light's exterior color from reddish brown to white – the original color of the tower when installed in 1878. The color change from brown to white was precipitated by a VERI engineering evaluation in 1987. At the time, it was determined that the dark reddish-brown color of the cast iron exterior was causing the tower to overheat. After gaining heat during warm weather, the interior of lighthouse's cast iron would sweat from condensation, thus accelerating rust corrosion and rotting of interior wood walls on the second floor.

== Public access ==
Public access to the East Chop Light was closed after its automation in 1933. For the first time in fifty-five years, Vineyard Environmental Research, Inst., opened the light to limited public access in 1988. This public access was allowed after VERI made extensive restoration and safety alterations of the light's interior and exterior, including an elevated lighting room exterior balcony guardrail. The extent of public access was determined after VERI held meetings with abutting property owners and the East Chop Association. As a result, VERI allowed public access to the light every Sunday during the summer season, and on special occasions such as weddings and fundraisers. The light is currently managed by the Martha's Vineyard Museum.

== Lighthouse license transfer ==
In 1994, VERI transferred their three lighthouse licenses to the Martha's Vineyard Historical Society (MVHS), which is now known as the Martha's Vineyard Museum. At the time of the 1994 transfer, William Waterway Marks was also a member of MVHS's board, and was installed as the first chairman of the newly formed MVHS Lighthouse Committee, where he served for four years from 1994 to 1997. MV Museum board member, Craig Dripps, followed Marks as the MV Museum's Lighthouse Committee Chair, with Marks remaining as a member of the committee for several years as an advisor. The Martha's Vineyard Museum has been caretaking the three lighthouse since 1994, although the United States Coast Guard continues to own the structures. In 2003, the MV Museum paid $25,000 for a professional assessment of all three lighthouses by Gary Gredell, who had previously worked on the restoration of forty-six lighthouses on the east coast. When funds from the Community Preservation Act were made available for lighthouse restoration, the MV Museum hired Campbell Construction Group of Beverly, MA., to overhaul the lights at East Chop and Edgartown. During the summer of 2007, the East Chop Lighthouse was refurbished inside and out, with new electrical wiring, new windows (except for the ground floor), and a refurbished exterior.

== Present Day ==
The current United States Coast Guard Light List description is "White tower". The actual light is 79 feet (24 m) above Mean High Water. Through the concern and effort of the Martha's Vineyard community, the East Chop Light survives today as an iconic symbol of the island's rich maritime history. In 1987, the East Chop Light was placed on the National Register of Historic Places as East Chop Light, while under management of VERI through its United States Coast Guard license number DTCGZ71101-85-RP-007L.

== East Chop Light Keepers ==
Silas Daggett (privately owned light 1869–1878); George Silvey (1876–1898); George H. Fisher (1898–1902); George Walter Purdy (1902–1934); William Waterway Marks (Principal Keeper 1985–1994); Bill Brown (Assistant Keeper 1985–1988); Della Hardman (Assistant Keeper 1987–1990); Elizabeth Talbot (Assistant Keeper 1985–1992).

== See also ==
- National Register of Historic Places listings in Dukes County, Massachusetts
