= Edgartown Village Historic District =

Historic district in Massachusetts, United States

- U.S. National Register of Historic Places
- U.S. Historic district
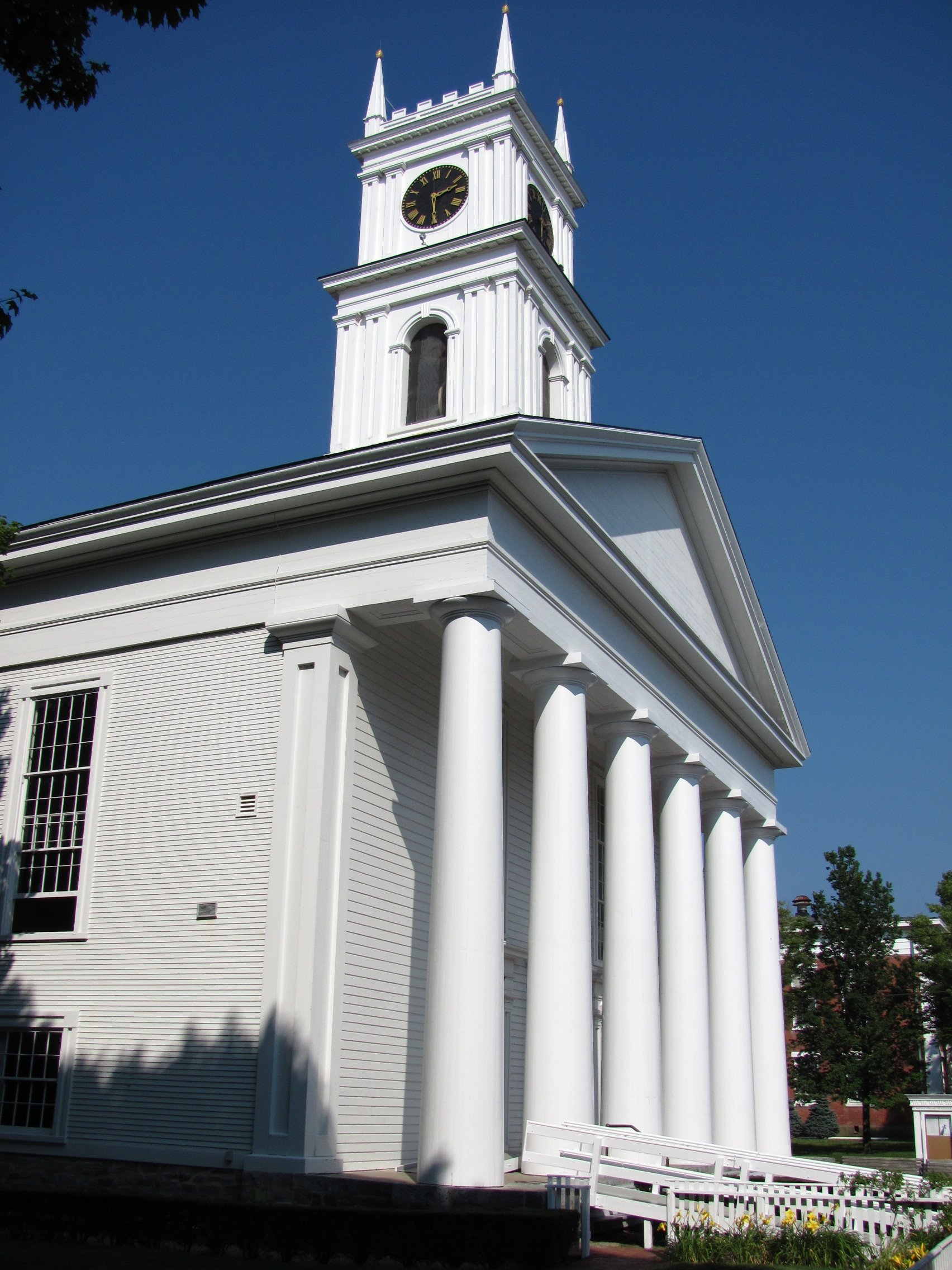
- Old Whaling Church

- Location within Massachusetts Location within the United States
- Location: Edgartown, Massachusetts
- Coordinates: 41°23′25″N 70°30′45″W
- Architectural style: Late Victorian, Federal
- NRHP reference No.: 83003967
- Added to NRHP: December 9, 1983

The Edgartown Village Historic District is a historic district encompassing the traditional center of Edgartown, Massachusetts, on the island of Martha's Vineyard. The district is roughly bounded by Water St. (North and South) and Pease's Point Way (North and South), and encompasses some 500 acres (200 ha). The buildings within the district primarily represent the period of Edgartown's growth in the 19th century, featuring the elaborate houses of wealthy ship captains, as well as significant public buildings such as the Dukes County Courthouse and Jail, the Federated Church, and the Whaling Church. The district was listed on the National Register of Historic Places in 1983.

Edgartown was settled after the area was granted in 1641 to Thomas Mayhew, having previously been occupied by the Wampanoag people, and was incorporated in 1671, when Martha's Vineyard was part of New York. Only portions of First Period construction have survived in Edgartown; one example is the Captain D. Fisher House on North Water Street (c. 1704). Most of the 18th century houses that survive are vernacular in their construction methods; the Thomas Cooke House (c. 1765) is a typical Georgian five-bay house with a central chimney.

Edgartown's heyday during the 19th century was roughly during the second quarter of the 19th century, when the whaling industry dominated its economy. As a result, a large portion of its architecture is in the most popular style from that time, the Greek Revival. However, side-hall plans that were typical of this time in other parts of Massachusetts were uncommon here, Most of the buildings from this period were cottages of one and a half stories, with modest styling such as corner pilasters. The Fisher House on Morse Street is probably the most elaborate Greek Revival house in the village. Because of the decline in the whaling industry and the village economy, there are comparatively few Victorian period buildings. Between 1895 and about 1930 a number of summer houses were built, predominantly in Colonial Revival styling.

== See also ==
- National Register of Historic Places listings in Dukes County, Massachusetts
