= Barn House =

- U.S. National Register of Historic Places
- U.S. Historic district
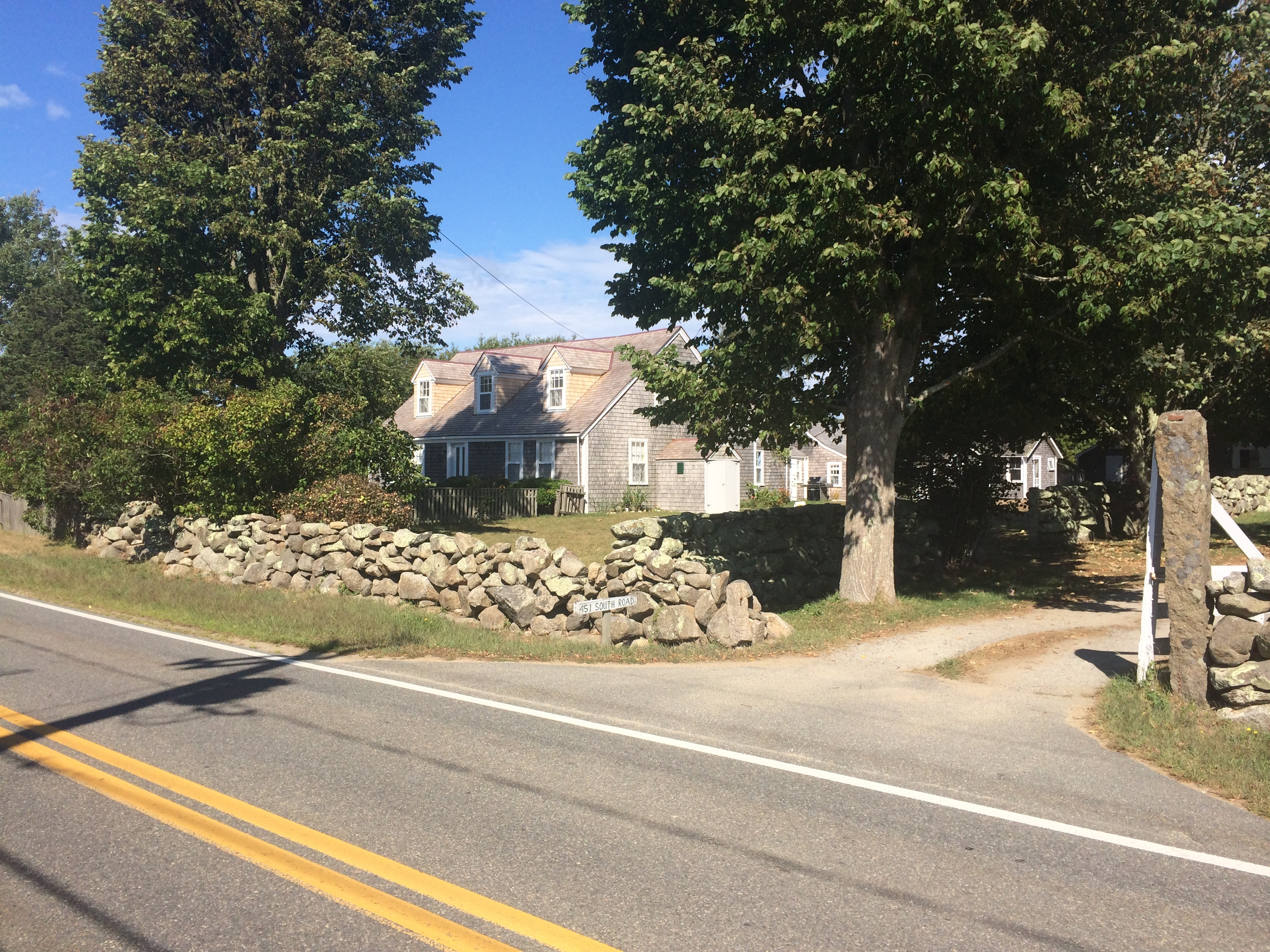

- Location within Massachusetts Location within the United States
- Location: Chilmark, Massachusetts
- Coordinates: 41°20′35.5″N 70°43′58″W
- Built: c. 1690; 1786; 1920s
- NRHP reference No.: 11000920
- Added to NRHP: December 15, 2011

Barn House is the site of a summer artists' colony in Chilmark, Massachusetts, on the island of Martha's Vineyard. The property includes one of the oldest houses in Chilmark, a barn dating from the 1780s, and facilities constructed primarily during the 1920s by the Chilmark Associates to facilitate its use as a summer retreat. The property represents aspects of the island's development from its agrarian origins to a summer vacation destination.

== History ==
English settlement of the island of Martha's Vineyard began in 1641. One early settler in what is now Chilmark, Massachusetts was Nathan Skiffe, who established a 50 acres (20 ha) sheep farm in 1686. The raising of sheep continued to be a major business in Chilmark into the 19th century, and his property continued to be used for that purpose by descendants and extended family members into the early 20th century. Skiffe built a house on the property in about 1690. Evidence indicates that some of the timbers used in its construction may have been recycled from other structures, likely hauled from elsewhere on the island. In addition to the house, the only major structure to survive into the 20th century is a barn, dated to the 1780s.

In 1919 Gertrude King acquired 43 acres (17 ha), including the house and barn, on behalf of a group friends who eventually organized as the Chilmark Associates. This group of well-to-do liberal artists, writers, and activists sought to adapt the property for use as a communal summer retreat. To this end they adapted the barn for use as a dining and meeting center for their community, and constructed a series of cabins in which to live. In 1927 they formally named the property "Barn House". The membership of the Chilmark Associates fluctuated over time. Notable members and guests include journalist Walter Lippman, jurist Felix Frankfurter, judge and political activist Dorothy Kenyon, painter Thomas Hart Benton, poet Sylvia Plath, writer Max Eastman.

== District elements ==
Barn House was listed on the National Register of Historic Places in 2011. The district's contributing elements include the following buildings:

- Barn House, c. 1690
- Barn, c. 1786
- A shed, c. 1850
- Seven cabins, constructed between 1920 and 1959

The following resources also contribute:

- The property's stone walls, which appear to date to the 18th century
- A stone-slab culvert over a stream, dating to the 19th century

Non-contributing resources in the district include a tennis court and bath house, as well as a c. 2001 cabin.

== See also ==
- National Register of Historic Places listings in Dukes County, Massachusetts
