= The Arcade (Oak Bluffs, Massachusetts) =

Building in Oak Bluffs, Massachusetts

- U.S. National Register of Historic Places
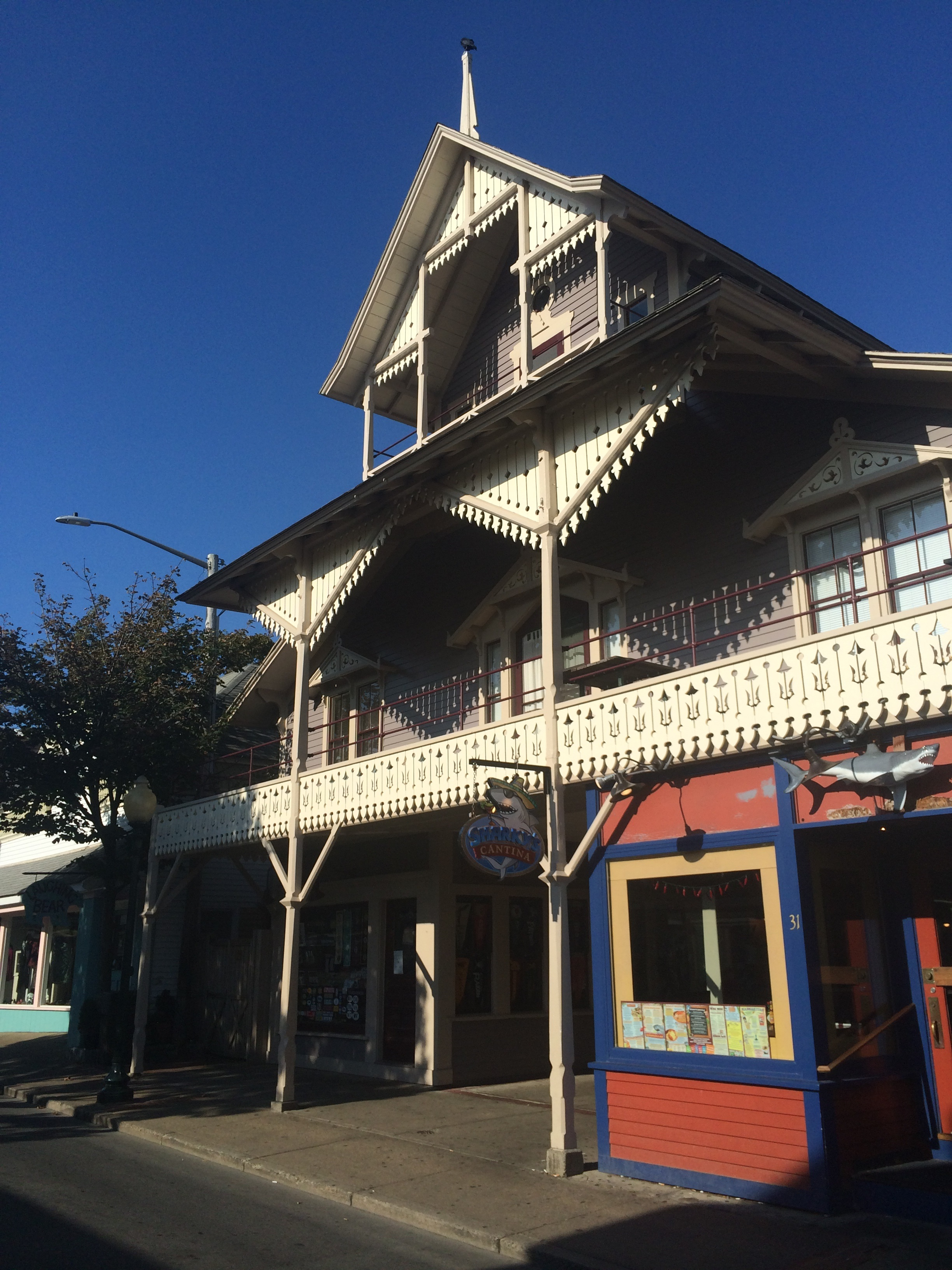

- Location within Massachusetts Location within the United States
- Location: Oak Bluffs, Massachusetts
- Coordinates: 41°27′21.41″N 70°33′30″W
- Architect: Pratt, Samuel
- Architectural style: Gothic
- NRHP reference No.: 94000813
- Added to NRHP: August 5, 1994

The Arcade is an historic building at 31 Circuit Avenue in Oak Bluffs, Massachusetts. Built in the early 1870s, it is one of the best preserved buildings on Circuit Ave, and is further locally significant as housing the offices of the Oak Bluffs Land and Wharf Company, which was responsible for much of the early development of the town of Oak Bluffs. The property was listed on the National Register of Historic Places in 1994.

== History ==
Oak Bluffs, Massachusetts, located on the northeastern part of the island of Martha's Vineyard, was originally settled as part of Edgartown in the 17th century. In 1835 the Methodist camp known as Wesleyan Grove (now a National Historic Landmark) was established in the area. Development of the area as a summer resort became more formally organized with the establishment of the Oak Bluffs Land and Wharf Company in 1866. The company developed what was then one of the earliest planned communities, guiding the community's growth over the following years.

In about 1871 the company constructed what is known as The Arcade. The building, designed by the locally prominent architect Samuel Pratt, is a three-story wood frame construction, originally with gingerbread-decorated balconies in front and back. The lower two floors are both the full width of the building, although the first floor is punctured by a passage connecting Circuit Ave. to Wesleyan Grove. The third floor is significantly smaller than the lower floors.

The building has historically served a variety of purposes. At one time it housed the Oak Bluffs post office, and in 1886 it is known to have housed the town's public library. It now occupies a place in the heart of the Oak Bluffs commercial and retail district on Circuit Avenue.

== See also ==
- National Register of Historic Places listings in Dukes County, Massachusetts
