= Yarmouth Camp Ground Historic District =

Historic district in Massachusetts, United States

- U.S. National Register of Historic Places
- U.S. Historic district
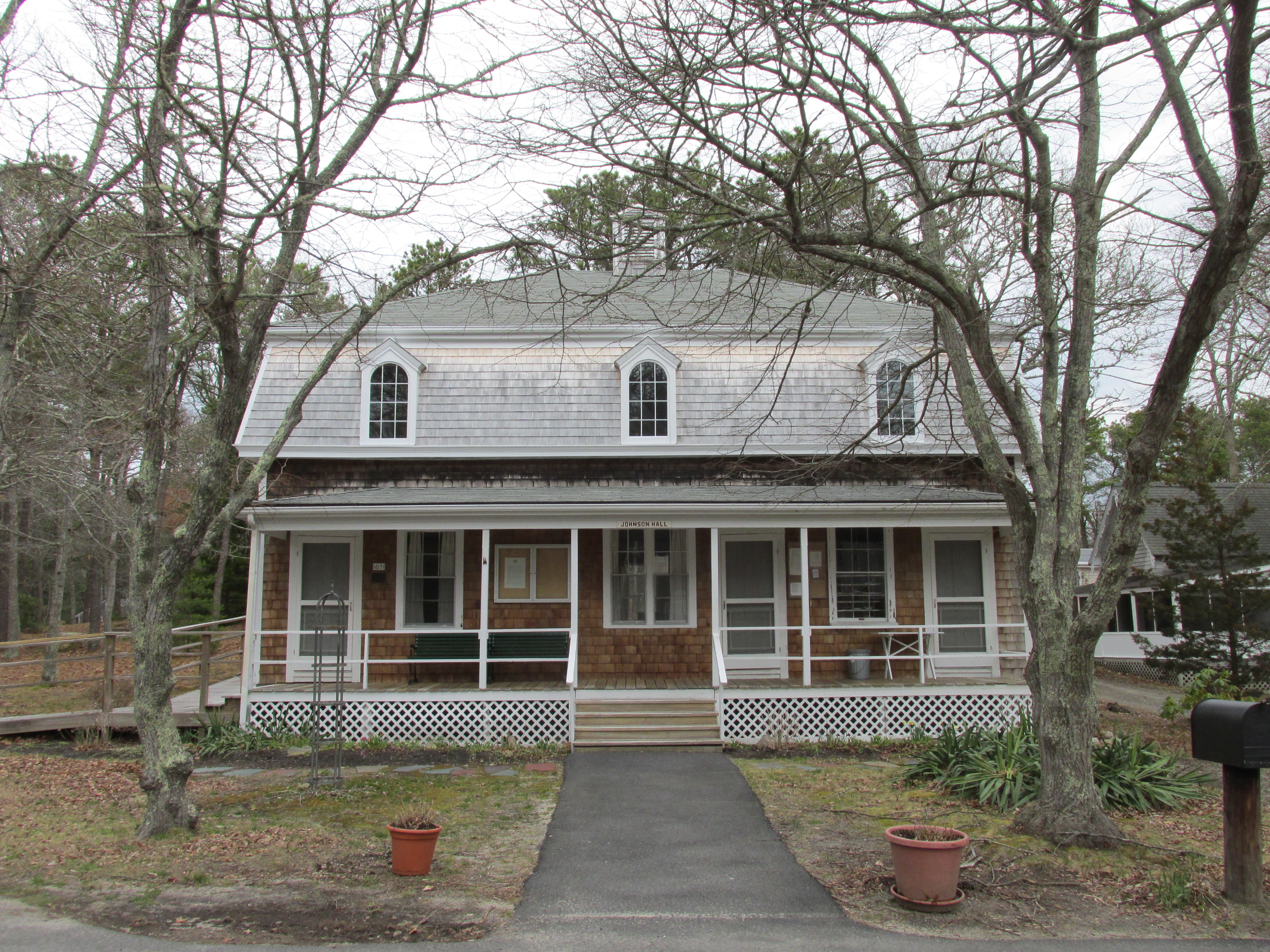
- Johnson Hall

- Location within Cape Cod Location within Massachusetts Location within the United States
- Location: Yarmouth and Barnstable, Massachusetts
- Coordinates: 41°40′59″N 70°15′44″W
- Area: 60.6 acres (24.5 ha)
- Architectural style: Second Empire, Gothic Revival
- NRHP reference No.: 90001244
- Added to NRHP: August 28, 1990

The Yarmouth Camp Ground Historic District is a historic district encompassing a religious summer camp meeting ground in Yarmouth and Barnstable, Massachusetts. The core of the camp ground was purchased in 1863 by the Sandwich District Camp Meeting Association, a Methodist Episcopal organization, and was operated until 1939. The area contains a well-preserved collection of predominantly residential buildings built during this period; it was listed on the National Register of Historic Places in 1990.

== Description and history ==
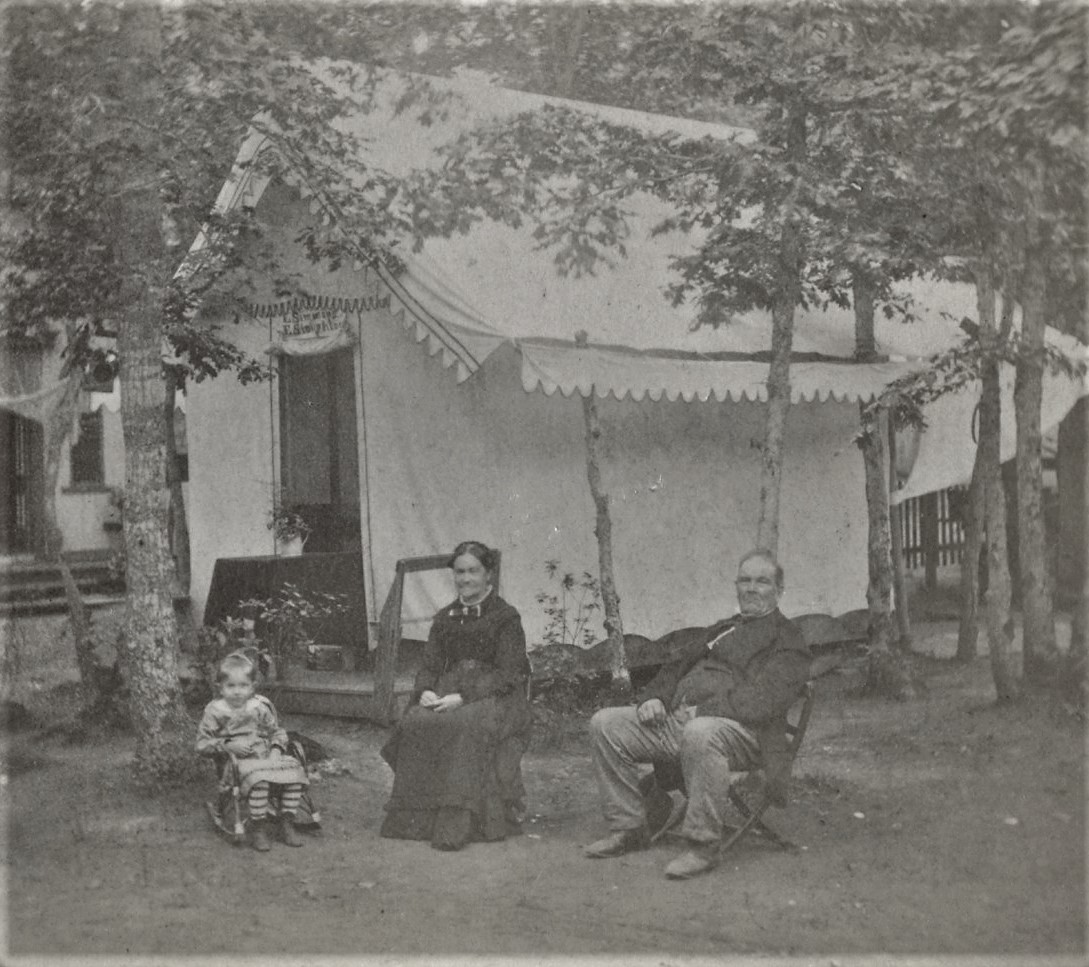
Early image of a family in front of their tent at Yarmouth Camp Ground

The Yarmouth Camp Ground is located in western Yarmouth and eastern Barnstable. It is located south of the mid-Cape Highway (Massachusetts Route 6), and is roughly bounded by County Ave., Willow St., Wood Rd., and Camp Ground Pond. Although Methodist Episcopalians had been holding camp meetings on Cape Cod since 1819, an earlier site in Eastham was logistically difficult to reach. This site was chosen in 1862, in part due to its proximity to the Yarmouth Depot, a train station just 1 mile (1.6 km) away. The property was at first developed in a somewhat haphazard, evolutionary way, focused on the main tabernacle, in contrast to other, more formally-planned camp meeting sites such as Wesleyan Grove. Over a 25-year period a network of paths and roadways grew, with tents used by early visitors eventually replaced by small Gothic cottages. The site was used for religious summer camps until 1939; in 1946 it was acquired by the Yarmouth Camp Ground Association, a secular organization established to own the area's common land and preserve the character of its buildings.

The architecture of the camp ground is typical of other camp meeting sites, predominantly Gothic Revival in character. Typical cottages are 1-1/2 story wood frame buildings with gable roof, having a kitchen and living room below and small bedrooms above. A number of the early cottages have essentially identical dimensions to their core structure, an indication of common plans and construction methods. Many have been altered to some extent, some to the point where the original structure is hard to discern from the numerous additions built around it. Exterior decorative elements include vertical board siding, although unfinished wooden-shingled walls typical of the region are also quite common. Vergeboard "gingerbread" trim in the eaves and gable ends is also fairly common.

There are three notable departures from the cottages in the camp ground. A larger year-round caretaker's house lacking Gothic styling stands at 1 Grove Avenue, and a building used as a retail store stands at 63 Grace Avenue. Johnson Hall, at 69 Center Avenue, then as now houses the organization that oversees the area. The camp ground's tabernacle building, built in 1890, was severely damaged by hurricanes in 1938 and 1944, and was torn down in 1945.

== See also ==
- National Register of Historic Places listings in Barnstable County, Massachusetts
