= Old Mill (West Tisbury, Massachusetts) =

- U.S. National Register of Historic Places
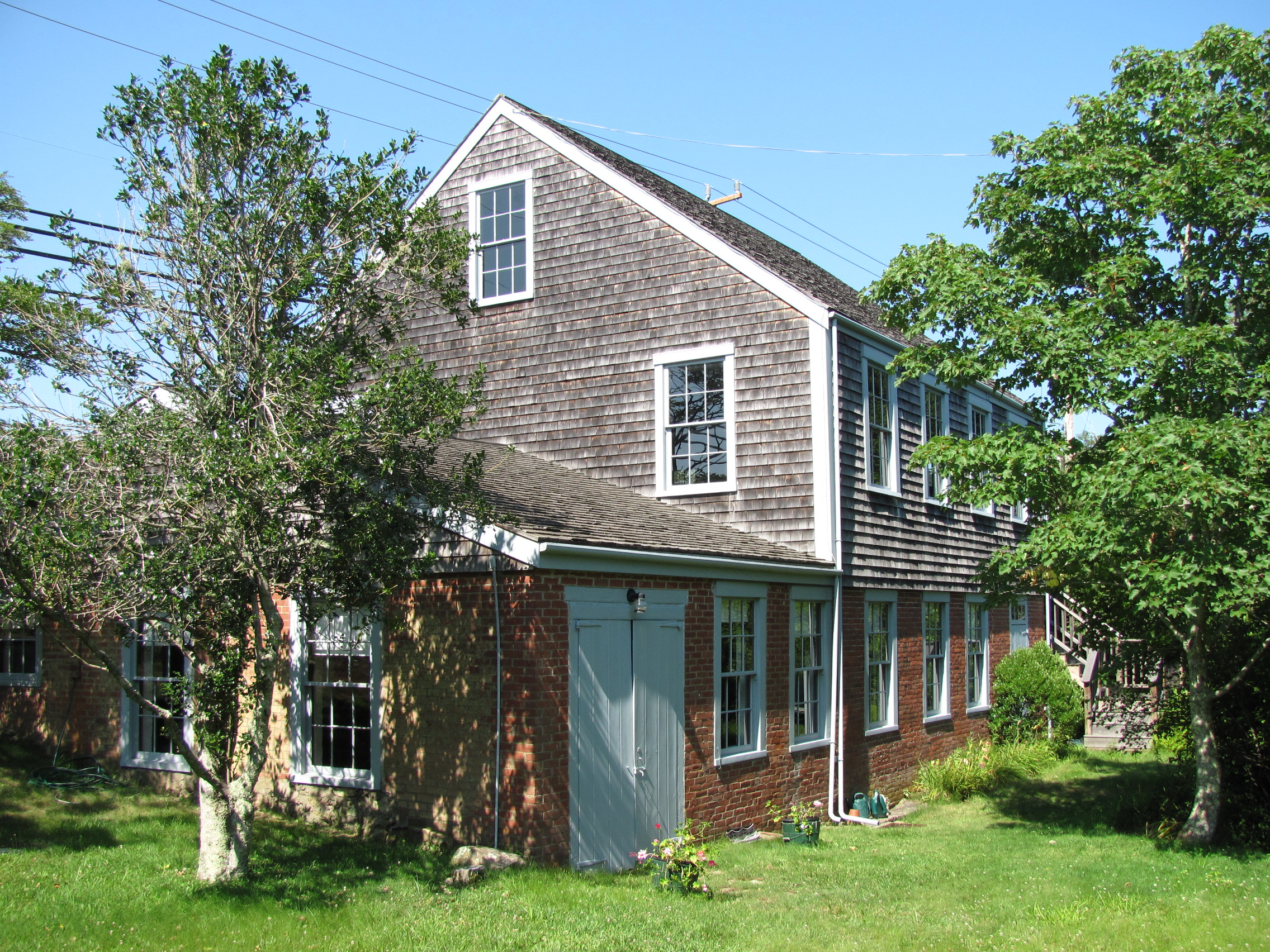
- Old Mill

- Location within Massachusetts Location within the United States
- Location: West Tisbury, Massachusetts
- Coordinates: 41°22′55″N 70°40′20″W
- Built: 1848
- NRHP reference No.: 84002303
- Added to NRHP: March 29, 1984

The Old Mill is an historic mill building at 690 Edgartown-West Tisbury Road in West Tisbury, Massachusetts, on the island of Martha's Vineyard. The current structure was built c. 1848, and occupies a site that has seen industrial use since the 17th century. The property is currently owned by the Martha's Vineyard Garden Club.

== History ==
The Old Mill is located just outside the center of West Tisbury, Massachusetts, in the central-western portion of Martha's Vineyard. The site has seen industrial uses since the 1650s, not long after English settlers arrived on the island. The property was purchased in 1845 by Captain Thomas Bradley for $1,800, at which time it included a "dilapidated ... mill". Bradley constructed a new, 2 1/2-story mill building on the site. It was used as a woolen mill until about 1873. After that, the property went through a succession of owners and uses, including a tea room, art gallery, and auction house.

The building has been the headquarters of the Martha's Vineyard Garden Club since 1937. The club purchased the property in 1942, and it was listed on the National Register of Historic Places in 1984.

== Setting and architecture ==
The mill building is a modest 2 1/2-story brick and wood-frame structure on 26 acres (11 ha) of land, most of which is south of the Edgartown-West Tisbury Road. The building sites near the road, just to its south, and is set into a south-facing hill. The mill pond is the only major part of the property that is on the north side of the road. A parking area near the mill is screened by trees, and most of the land is naturally landscaped.

The mill itself consists of a rectangular main block, 7 bays wide and 4 deep, with an ell of 1.5 stories extending from its eastern elevation. Each floor of the building consists of a single open room. A stairway provides access between the first and second floors, and a modern pulldown ladder provides access to the top floor. A deck, a variant of an earlier one, adorns the east side of the building, as does a small modern addition providing modern plumbing facilities. The building is built on a foundation of rubble, with brick on the lower levels that are exposed from the hillside. The mill's power supply, Red Brook, flows through a conduit under the mill, although there are no visible signs remaining of how its power was harnessed.

== See also ==
- National Register of Historic Places listings in Dukes County, Massachusetts
