= West Chop =

Human settlement in Tisbury, Massachusetts, United States

Coordinates: 41°28′48″N 70°36′10″W

"The Cedars," a turn-of-the-19th-century hotel at West Chop, as it appeared in the early 20th century.

West Chop is a residential area located in the town of Tisbury, Massachusetts on the north end of the island of Martha's Vineyard. It is a peninsula surrounded on the north and west by Vineyard Sound and on the east by Vineyard Haven Harbor. A lighthouse, West Chop Light, stands at the north end of the chop. It is accessible by car from Vineyard Haven by two roads, Franklin Street and Main Street.

West Chop has no obvious commercial businesses or stores, it used to have its own zip code (02573) and a seasonal post office, but these were closed during cutbacks to the USPS. It also has a private seasonal country club, the West Chop Club, and a nine-hole golf course, Mink Meadows Golf Club. There is also a small graveyard, the West Chop cemetery.

West Chop has been a popular summer resort area since the late 19th century, and has been the summer home to many notable residents, including Panama Canal engineer Gen. George W. Goethals, Yale president and U.K. ambassador Kingman Brewster Jr., United States Secretary of the Air Force James H. Douglas Jr., and composer George Chadwick.

In the summer of 1888, a steamboat wharf was completed at West Chop with regular steamship landings from the mainland, and throughout the 1890s the West Chop summer colony boasted two hotels, a bowling alley, a billiard hall, and tennis courts., although today only the club's tennis courts and small private docks remain.
