= Wesleyan Grove =

Religious camp in Oak Bluffs, Massachusetts

- U.S. National Register of Historic Places
- U.S. National Historic Landmark District
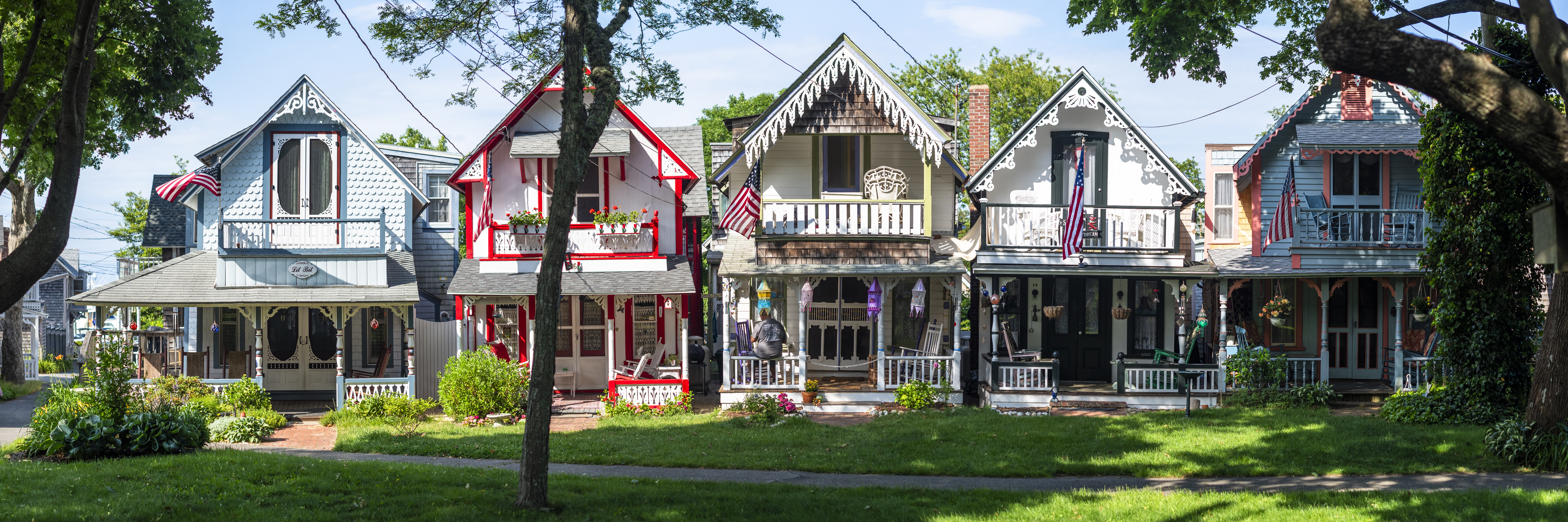
- A row of ornate cottages on the campground site.

- Location within Massachusetts Location within the United States
- Location: 80 Trinity Park, Oak Bluffs, MA 02557
- NRHP reference No.: 05000458

Significant dates
- Added to NRHP: April 5, 2005
- Designated NHLD: April 5, 2005

- Martha's Vineyard Campground
- U.S. National Register of Historic Places
- U.S. Historic district
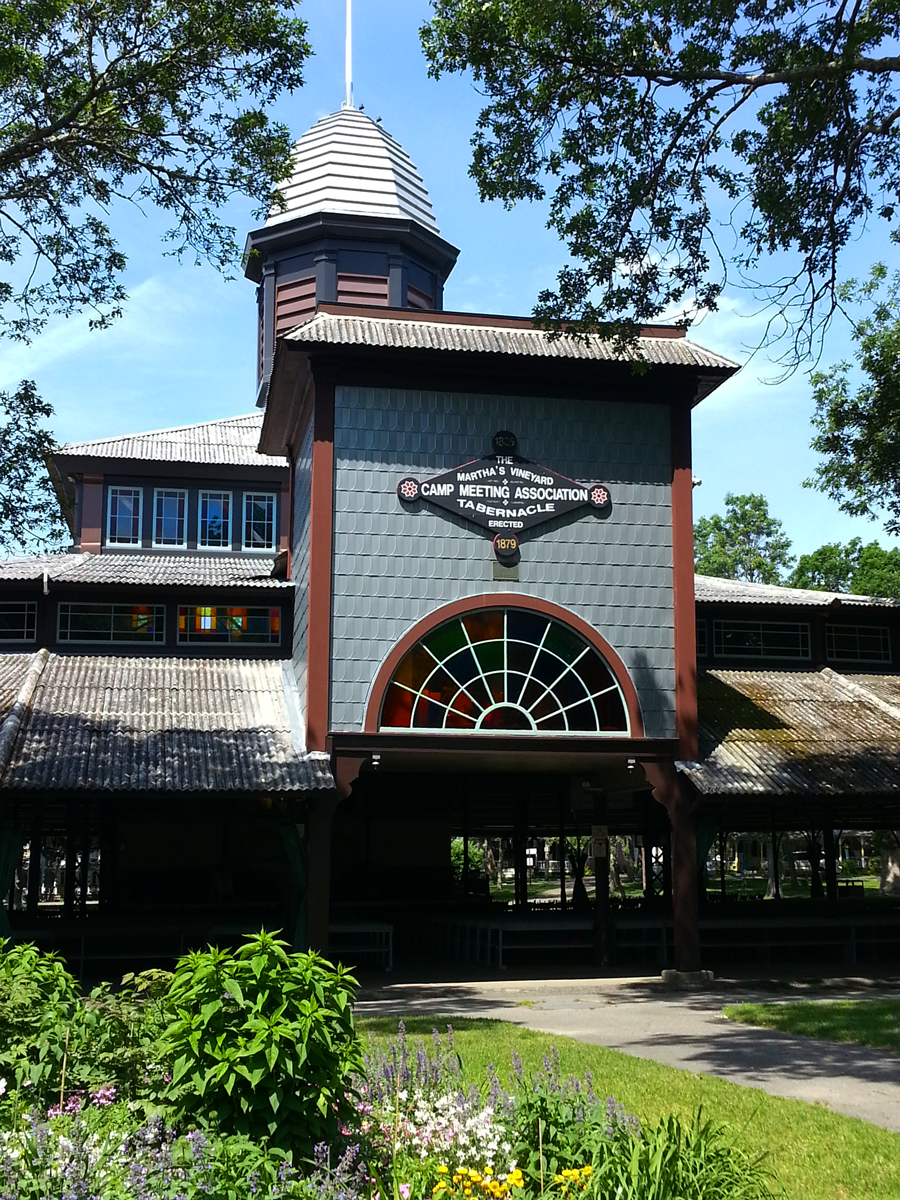
- The Campground Tabernacle in the center of Wesleyan Grove

- Location within Massachusetts Location within the United States
- Location: Roughly bounded by Cottage Park, Quequechan, Clinton, Dukes, County, Siloam, Lake, and Central Aves., Oak Bluffs, Massachusetts
- Coordinates: 41°27′19″N 70°33′41″W
- Built: 1835
- Architect: Multiple
- Architectural style: Late Gothic Revival, Gothic, Gothic Revival
- NRHP reference No.: 78000439
- Added to NRHP: December 14, 1978

Wesleyan Grove is a 34-acre (14 ha) National Historic Landmark District in Oak Bluffs, Massachusetts on the island of Martha's Vineyard. Named after John Wesley, the founder of the Methodist Church. Also known as the Martha's Vineyard Campmeeting Association (MVCMA), the Campgrounds, or the Gingerbread Houses, it was the first summer religious camp established in the United States. It is famous for its approximately 300 colorful cottages in a style now described as Carpenter Gothic.

== History ==
Just after the American Civil War, the area developed as a large Methodist summer campground with open air Christian revivals. This meeting style became popular around the United States at the time, and many other similar camps were founded using similar models, such as Ocean Park, Maine, Merrick, Long Island, and Ocean Grove, New Jersey. Colorful, ornate, gingerbread cottages were built in an oak grove around a central church tabernacle.

The grove was added to the National Register of Historic Places in 1978, recognized in 2000 by the National Trust for Historic Preservation and declared a National Historic Landmark by the US Department of the Interior in 2005.

=== The early years ===
The first so-called campmeeting in what became known as Wesleyan Grove was held in 1835. Over subsequent years, participants began arriving early and staying after the revival. Nine tents provided shelter for the first campers in 1835, but as the campers grew in number, families chose to pitch tents of their own; there were 100 tents in 1851 and that increased to 320 by 1858, located around the preaching ground. During one Sunday in summer 1858, there were a full 20,000 people listening to a sermon.

In subsequent years the congregations grew enormously, and many of the thousands in attendance were housed in large tents known as "society tents." A congregation from a church on the mainland would maintain its own society tent. Conditions were cramped, with men and women sleeping dormitory-style on opposite sides of a central canvas divider. Society tents were arranged in a semicircle on Trinity Park. Over time, families began leasing small lots on which to pitch their own individual tents. "Between 1855 and 1865 the campmeetings began to change in character. They continued to be religious in nature, but the participants also began to enjoy the benefit of the sea air and social interaction as they revived both mind and body."

=== Gingerbread cottages ===
In the 1860s and 1870s, the family tents were rapidly replaced with permanent wooden cottages. There were 40 cottages in 1864 and 500 by 1880. As of 2019, there were approximately 318 cottages remaining. They are referred to as the gingerbread cottages. One source provides this description of the original buildings:

[They were] between 11 and 16 feet in width, with wide, double-door entrances and tall roofs with steep gables pitched at 90 degrees. They were one and a half stories in height, and generally twice as tall as they were wide. The wooden platforms over which the tents had been erected morphed into the wide front porches of the cottages.

Today the Campground is a community of summer residents and a smaller number of year-round residents who own the cottages (often fully modernized) or rent them from the owners. Some of these folks are descendants of early Holiness revivalists although Wesleyan Grove is no longer a revivalist camp. Sunday services are still held in the summer, but the Grove has been non-denominational since the 1930s. Nonetheless, a Grand Illumination takes place on a Wednesday evening in summer (Illumination Night), with illuminated paper or silk lanterns, continuing a 150 year tradition. (The 2020 event was canceled due to the COVID-19 pandemic in the United States.)

A National Geographic report in 2019 described the Illumination as follows:

During this spectacle, now celebrating its sesquicentennial, residents and guests gather in the Oak Bluffs Tabernacle for a twilight sing-along, followed by the ceremonial candle lighting of one of the lanterns. The residents then light their own lanterns until the whole village is illuminated by the colorful paper and silk designs.

=== Religious aspects ===
Many eminent members of the clergy from across the country have preached at the campmeetings in Wesleyan Grove. That tradition continues today, although services are no longer held day and night as they were in the early years. Over time, the Martha's Vineyard Camp Meeting Association has become increasingly interdenominational, and the current members of the Board of Directors are affiliated with a wide variety of religious groups. The religious services and special programs of the Association all have a strong ecumenical spirit. "Whereas the MVCMA was established by Methodists, and, for much of its history, was governed exclusively by Methodists, it has always been an autonomous organization and was never formally affiliated with the New England Conference of the United Methodist Church."

=== The Tabernacle ===
The open-air Tabernacle, made of cast iron, with seating for over 2,000, is the physical and spiritual center of the Campground. It was built in 1879 by John W. Hoyt with wrought iron arches and supports, two clerestories with dozens of colored glass windows, and an octagonal cupola.

From the first camp meeting in 1835 until 1859, ministers preached from a crudely constructed stand. In 1859, Perez Mason built a larger and more aesthetically pleasing preachers' stand. It was large enough to seat 30, and it included lattice screen supports, movable rear shutters for ventilation, and a roof that was angled to amplify the voice of the speaker. Seating for congregations of up to 4,000 was constructed during that period. In 1869, a huge tent was raised over Wesleyan Grove to protect the congregation from the heat and the rain. The tent was used each season until the erection of the current iron Tabernacle in 1879.

By 2019 completed restoration work included stabilization of the columns, removal of lead paint and repainting, the addition of new lights that were historically accurate, restoration of the cupola and replacement of the cross and the rebuilding of the upper clerestory.

== Gallery ==
The first cottage built in Wesleyan Grove in the "gingerbread" style

Detail of "The Pink House", one of the most-photographed houses in the grove

Bishop Gilbert Haven’s cottage, which was visited by Ulysses Grant in 1874

A row of houses on a bright spring day

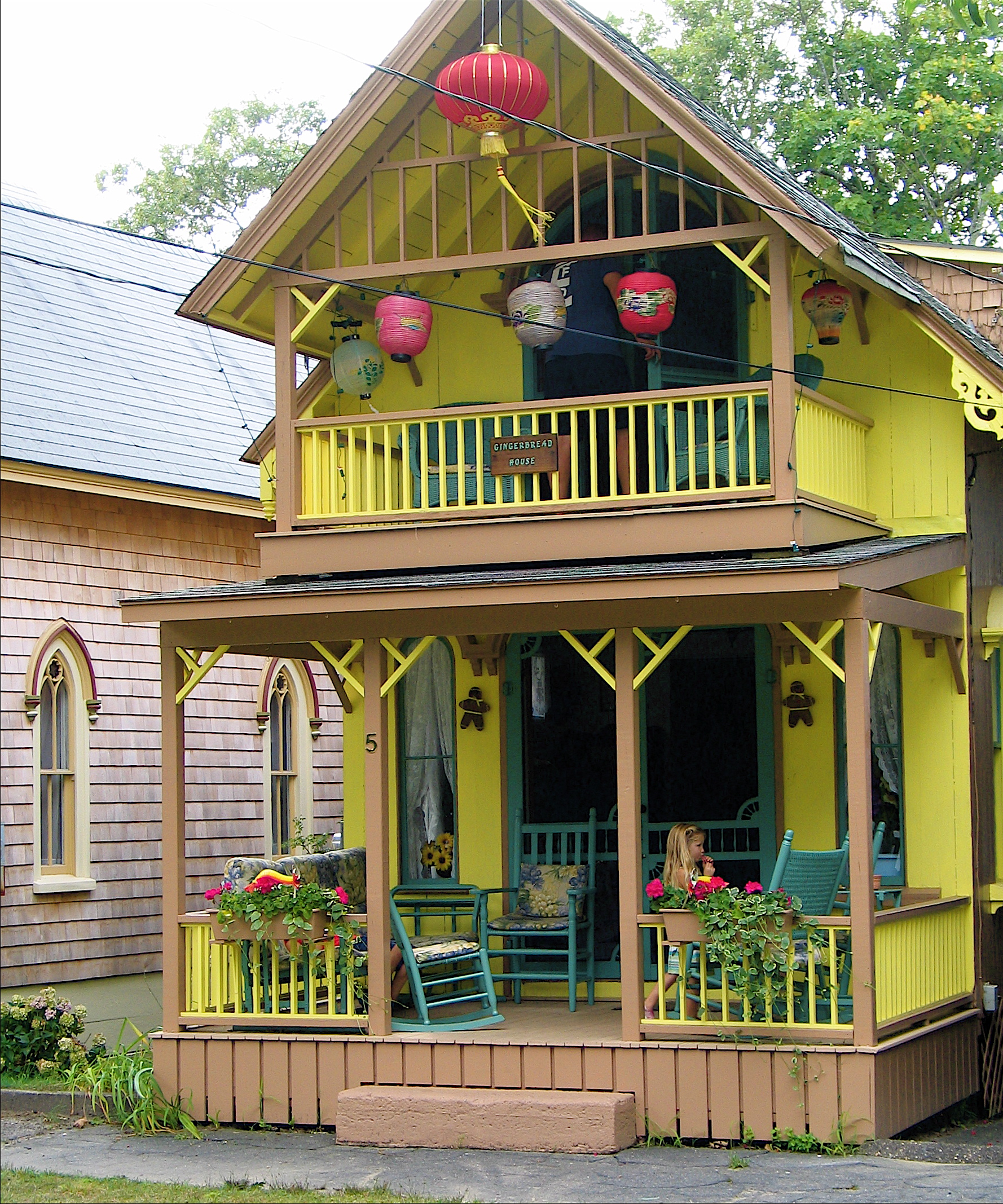
One of the cottages prepared for the Grand Illumination, a Wednesday evening tradition in summer

A view of a cottage during Grand Illumination Night (2007)

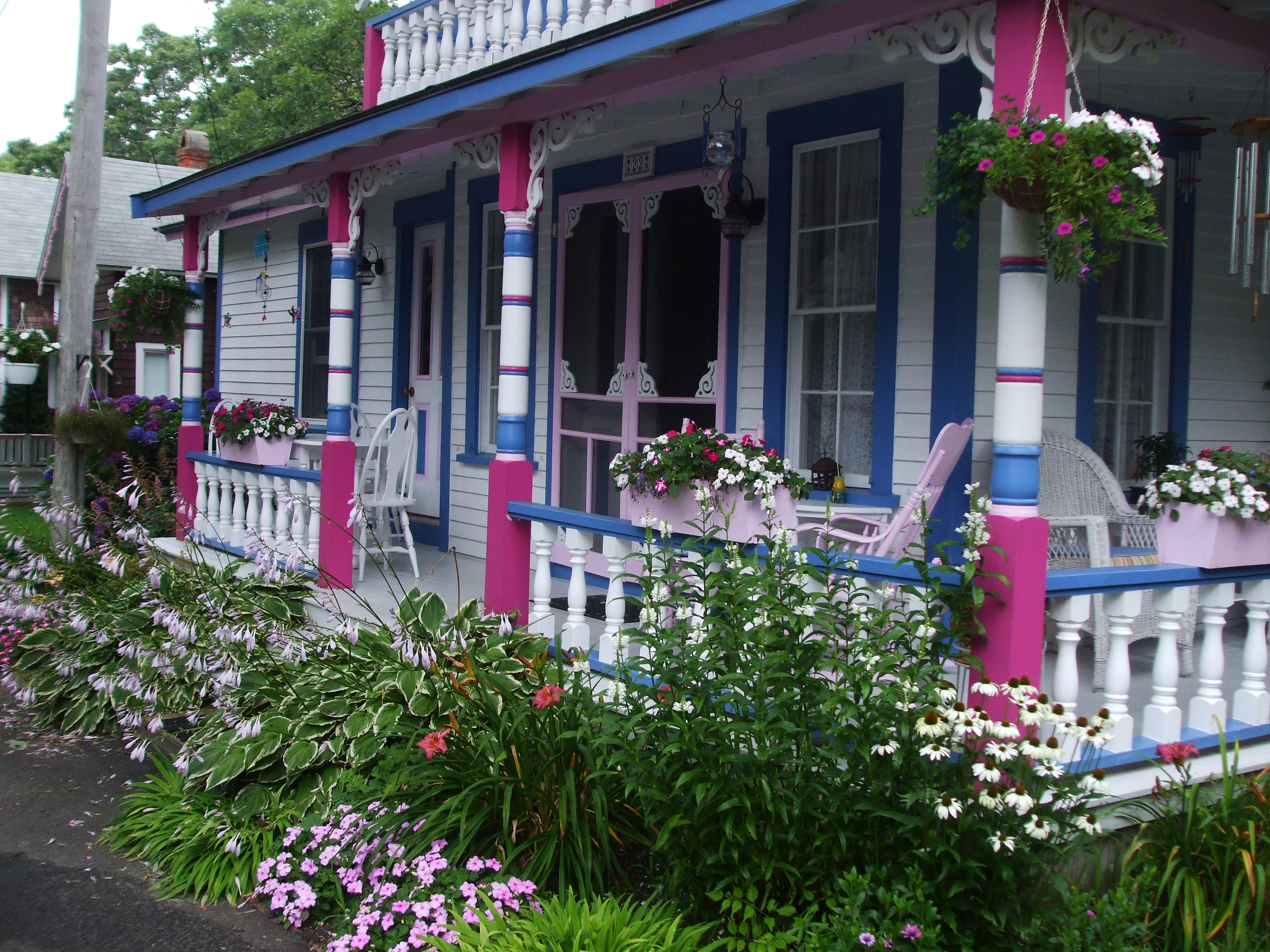
Many properties have colorful landscaping to compliment the colors of the cottage

== See also ==
- List of National Historic Landmarks in Massachusetts
- National Register of Historic Places listings in Dukes County, Massachusetts
