= Tisbury, Massachusetts =

- Town
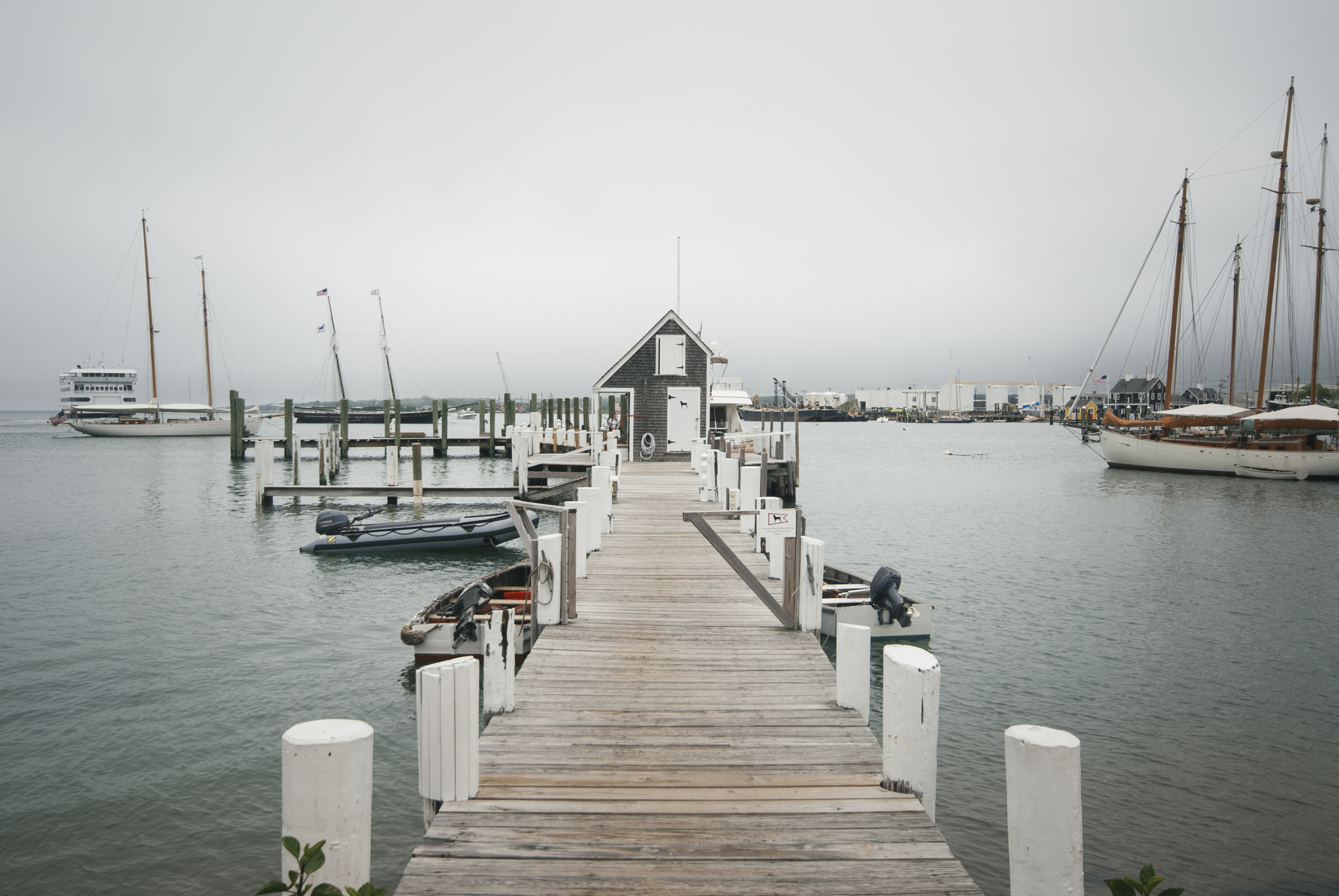
- Vineyard Haven Harbor

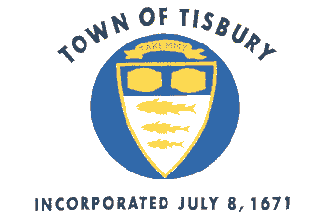
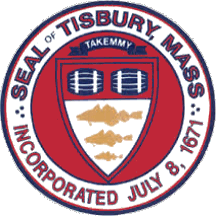
- Flag Seal

- Location in Dukes County in Massachusetts
- Coordinates: 41°27′22″N 70°36′40″W
- Country: United States
- State: Massachusetts
- County: Dukes
- Settled: 1660
- Incorporated: July 8, 1671

Government
  - Type: Open town meeting
  - Town Administrator: Joseph LaCivita

Area
  - Total: 19.1 sq mi (49.5 km^{2})
  - Land: 6.5 sq mi (16.9 km^{2})
  - Water: 12.6 sq mi (32.6 km^{2})
- Elevation: 89 ft (27 m)

Population (2020)
  - Total: 4,815
  - Density: 738/sq mi (284.9/km^{2})
- Time zone: UTC-5 (Eastern)
  - Summer (DST): UTC-4 (Eastern)
- ZIP Code: 02568 (Vineyard Haven)
- Area code: 508 / 774
- FIPS code: 25-69940
- GNIS feature ID: 0619443
- Website: www.tisburyma.gov

Tisbury is a town on Martha's Vineyard in Massachusetts. The population was 4,815 at the 2020 census.

Vineyard Haven is the main village/town center of Tisbury. The two names are used interchangeably. As can be seen in the history section below, the town of Tisbury was incorporated within the Commonwealth of Massachusetts in 1671, and remains the legal name of the town to this day. However, the port and harbor have had varying names. "Holmes Hole" was one of the first names of the port within the town of Tisbury. This name was later changed to "Vineyard Haven", which is the official post office name for the community. To residents of Martha's Vineyard, "Vineyard Haven" is by far the more common usage, although residents recognize Tisbury as the town's legal name.

Vineyard Haven in Tisbury is the main port of entrance to Martha's Vineyard, and is the only operational port on the island during most of the year.

== History ==
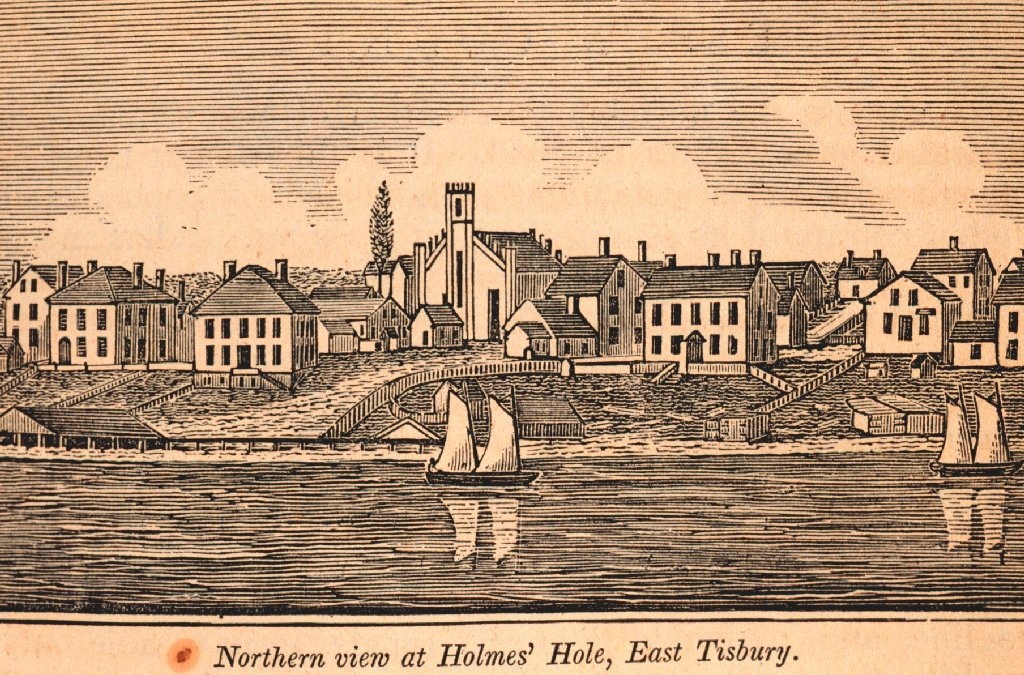
Northern view of Holmes Hole, East Tisbury, 1841

The Wampanoag have lived on Martha's Vineyard, which they called Noepe, continuously for approximately 5,000-15,000 years. The first English maritime explorer, Bartholomew Gosnold, came in 1602. Six decades later, in 1660, Tisbury was first settled by James Allen, William Peabody and Lt. Josiah Standish, a son of Captain Myles Standish. It was officially incorporated in 1671 by Francis Lovelace, Governor General of New York. The town, which originally included the lands of West Tisbury, was named for Tisbury, Wiltshire, England, the hometown of Martha's Vineyard Governor Mayhew. Citizens of the island, unhappy with the leadership of Governor Mayhew, petitioned William III and Mary II in 1673 for a change of leadership, and the entire island, including the town, became a part of Massachusetts.

The town was divided into its current boundaries in 1892.

The town has long thrived on the sea, and is now the home of the main ferry docks for the island. The island's first and primary ferry line is the Steamship Authority, which runs to and from Woods Hole, New Bedford, and Nantucket (in the summer months from the Oak Bluffs terminal), all in Massachusetts. There are several other private ferry lines that serve Martha's Vineyard as well, with terminals in the towns of Oak Bluffs and Edgartown. To get an idea of the embarkation in summer of passengers, tourists primarily, and goods, see the early scene in the movie Jaws which shows the debarkation on "Amity Island" of a typical boatload in summer at the Vineyard Haven Steamship Authority facility from the steamship Naushon. At the time of the filming of Jaws in 1975 this was the largest of the ferries, running only in the summer months for its high passenger capacity. It ceased service in 1987 and has been replaced by more modern vessels.

Like other communities on Martha's Vineyard, Tisbury is a popular summer destination. Notable people who have resided in Tisbury include Art Buchwald, William Styron, Mike Wallace, Lillian Hellman, Carly Simon, Thornton Wilder, Dashiell Hammett, Katharine Cornell, and Diane Sawyer.

Flask, the third mate of the Pequod in Herman Melville's Moby-Dick, hails from Tisbury.

== Geography ==
According to the United States Census Bureau, the town of Tisbury has a total area of 19.1 square miles (49.5 km^{2}), of which 6.5 square miles (16.9 km^{2}) is land and 12.6 square miles (32.6 km^{2}), or 65.79%, is water. The town ranks 329th out of the 351 communities in the Commonwealth in terms of land area, and is sixth out of the seven towns of Dukes County (only Aquinnah is smaller). Tisbury is bordered by Vineyard Haven Harbor, Lagoon Pond and Oak Bluffs to the east, West Tisbury to the southwest, and Vineyard Sound to the northwest. The town shares a common corner, along with West Tisbury and Oak Bluffs, with Edgartown. Localities of the town include Vineyard Haven, Makonikey, Pilot Hill, West Chop, and Lambert's Cove.

Measuring from the western shore of Tisbury to Nobska Point at Woods Hole (town of Falmouth), the town is 3.3 miles (5.3 km) from the mainland (Cape Cod), the closest point on the Vineyard. Most of central Tisbury is low-lying and near sea level, with elevations rising to 150 feet (46 m) in places. West Chop is the northernmost point on the Vineyard, tipped by the West Chop Light. The town is also home to Lake Tashmoo, just south of the tip of West Chop.

== Demographics ==
Historical population
Year	Pop.	±%
1790	1,142	—
1850	1,803	+57.9%
1860	1,631	−9.5%
1870	1,536	−5.8%
1880	1,518	−1.2%
1890	1,506	−0.8%
1900	1,149	−23.7%
1910	1,196	+4.1%
1920	1,275	+6.6%
1930	1,541	+20.9%
1940	1,966	+27.6%
1950	1,930	−1.8%
1960	2,169	+12.4%
1970	2,257	+4.1%
1980	2,972	+31.7%
1990	3,120	+5.0%
2000	3,755	+20.4%
2010	3,949	+5.2%
2020	4,815	+21.9%
2023*	4,865	+1.0%
* = population estimate.

As of the census of 2000, there were 3,755 people, 1,646 households, and 902 families residing in the town. The population density was 572.4 inhabitants per square mile (221.0/km^{2}). There were 2,720 housing units at an average density of 414.7 per square mile (160.1/km^{2}). The racial makeup of the town was 90.04% White, 2.96% African American, 1.36% Native American, 0.32% Asian, 0.05% Pacific Islander, 1.33% from other races, and 3.94% from two or more races. Hispanic or Latino of any race were 1.04% of the population.

A large percentage of the white population is of Portuguese descent, and a great number of "Native Islanders" (born on the island) within the community are of mixed ethnicity such as Portuguese, Native American (Wampanoag Indian), and African American families who have been there for generations, primarily tied to maritime ventures of fishing, whaling, and the fitting out of whaleships.

There were 1,646 households, out of which 25.5% had children under the age of 18 living with them, 40.9% were married couples living together, 10.3% had a female householder with no husband present, and 45.2% were non-families. 36.7% of all households were made up of individuals, and 13.5% had someone living alone who was 65 years of age or older. The average household size was 2.21 and the average family size was 2.92.

In the town, the population was spread out, with 21.5% under the age of 18, 5.5% from 18 to 24, 28.6% from 25 to 44, 26.5% from 45 to 64, and 17.9% who were 65 years of age or older. The median age was 42 years. For every 100 females, there were 88.0 males. For every 100 females age 18 and over, there were 83.7 males.

The median income for a household in the town was $37,041, and the median income for a family was $53,051. Males had a median income of $38,452 versus $29,034 for females. The per capita income for the town was $26,783. About 7.7% of families and 12.2% of the population were below the poverty line, including 22.9% of those under age 18 and 6.7% of those age 65 or over.

In terms of population, Tisbury ranks 267th in the Commonwealth and second only to Edgartown in Dukes County in terms of year-round population. The town ranks 167th statewide in terms of population density, below the mean but above the median. It is the most densely populated town in Dukes County.

There is a substantial dichotomy between the wealth of the year-round residents, which is generally below the Massachusetts median, and that of the summer residents, who tend to be quite wealthy.

== Government ==
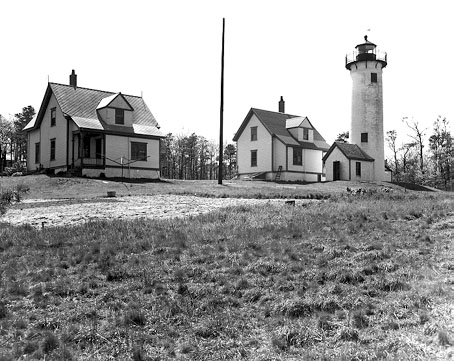
The Lighthouse of Tisbury (West Chop Light) in 1891

On the national level, Tisbury is a part of Massachusetts's 9th congressional district, and is currently represented by Bill Keating. Massachusetts is currently represented in the United States Senate by senior Senator Elizabeth Warren and junior Senator Ed Markey. On the state level, Tisbury is represented in the Massachusetts House of Representatives as a part of the Barnstable, Dukes and Nantucket district, which includes all of Martha's Vineyard and Nantucket, as well as a portion of Falmouth. The town is represented in the Massachusetts Senate as a portion of the Cape and Islands district, which includes all of Martha's Vineyard, Nantucket and most of Barnstable County (with the exception of Bourne, Sandwich, Falmouth and Mashpee). All of Dukes County is patrolled by the Fifth (Oak Bluffs) Barracks of Troop D of the Massachusetts State Police.

Tisbury is governed on the local level by the open town meeting form of government, and is led by a Town Administrator and a board of selectmen. The town has its own police and fire departments, both located within Vineyard Haven, just blocks from the steamship authority piers. The post office is also nearby. The Vineyard Haven Public Library is located just north of the heart of Vineyard Haven, and is a part of the Cape Libraries Automated Materials Sharing library network.

For 180 years, Tisbury was a "Dry" town; alcohol could not be sold or purchased. For a number of years, to encourage dining there, the town and its eating establishments practiced a policy of "BYOB." On April 27, 2012, town voters approved (by a vote of 881–747) a ballot initiative granting the town's selectmen authority to grant licenses for the sale of beer and wine. The first licenses were issued in July 2012. As of August 2012 eight establishments in Tisbury have beer and wine licenses.

== Education ==
Tisbury is part of the Martha's Vineyard Regional School District along with Aquinnah, Chilmark, Edgartown, Oak Bluffs, and West Tisbury. Students in Tisbury attend Tisbury Elementary School, from grades K-8. High School students then attend Martha's Vineyard Regional High School. The MVRHS's teams are nicknamed the Vineyarders, and their colors are violet and white. The school has a longstanding rivalry with Nantucket High School, with both competing for the Island Cup on an annual basis. The Tisbury school is the oldest school on the island. Built in 1929 and has been educating children for over 80 years. The Tisbury school colors are blue and gold, their mascot is a tiger.

Tisbury is also the home of the Vineyard Montessori School, which serves students from pre-kindergarten through third grade.

== Notable people ==
- Asa B. Carey, U.S. Army brigadier general
- Katharine Cornell, actress, writer, theater owner, and producer.
- Jim Ferraro, attorney
- Edmund C. Weeks, Florida politician
- Benjamin West, New Hampshire lawyer

== See also ==
- Tisbury, Wiltshire, a village with the same name
