= Vineyard Haven, Massachusetts =

- Census-designated place
- Main Street

- Location in Dukes County in Massachusetts
- Coordinates: 41°27′22″N 70°36′26″W
- Country: United States
- State: Massachusetts
- County: Dukes
- Town: Tisbury

Area
  - Total: 1.31 sq mi (3.40 km^{2})
  - Land: 1.31 sq mi (3.38 km^{2})
  - Water: 0.0077 sq mi (0.02 km^{2})
- Elevation: 46 ft (14 m)

Population (2020)
  - Total: 2,747
  - Density: 2,106.3/sq mi (813.23/km^{2})
- Time zone: UTC-5 (Eastern (EST))
  - Summer (DST): UTC-4 (EDT)
- ZIP Code: 02568
- Area code: 508
- FIPS code: 25-71970
- GNIS feature ID: 0616143

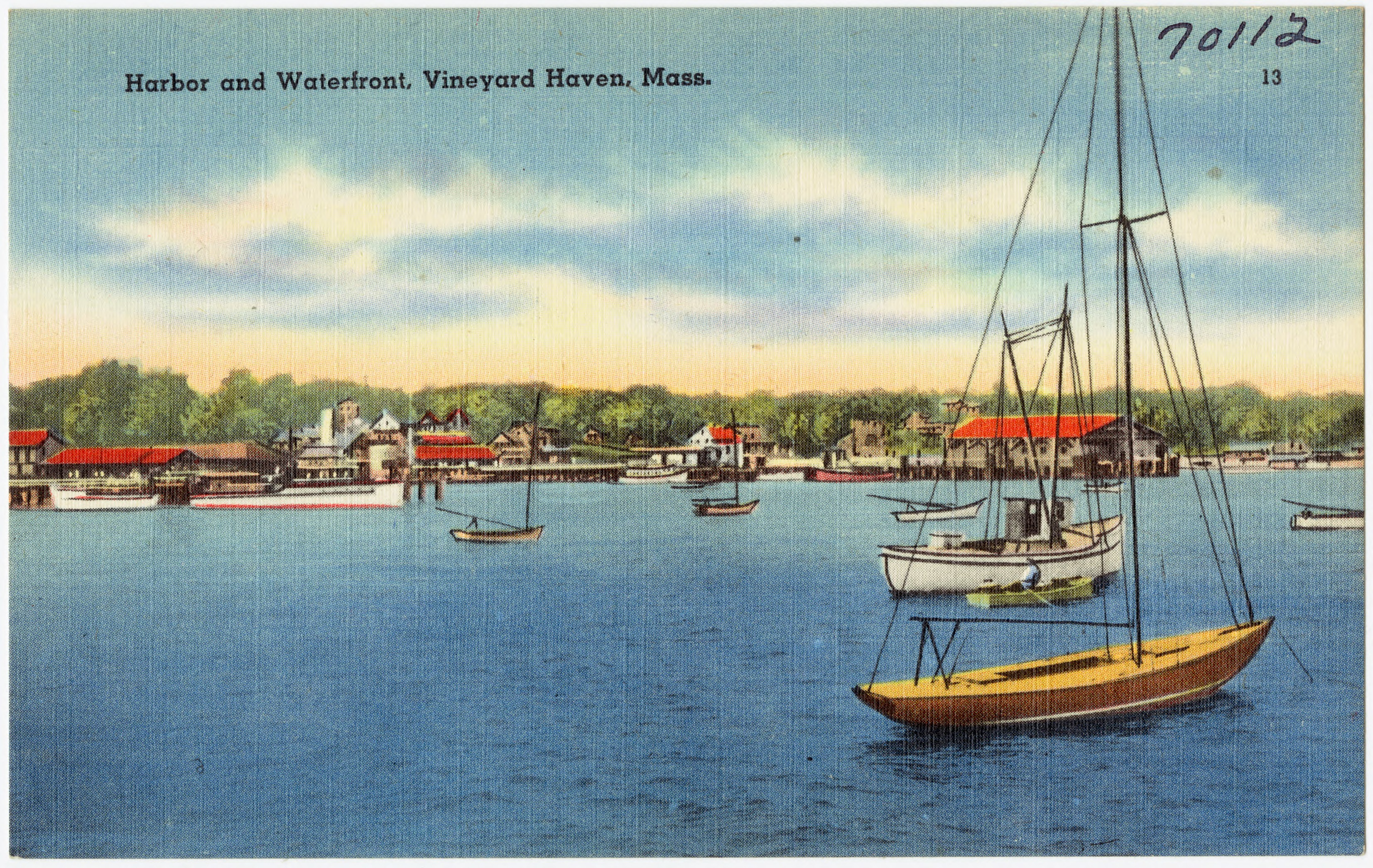
Harbor and Waterfront, Vineyard Haven, Mass

Vineyard Haven is a community within the town of Tisbury, Massachusetts on Martha's Vineyard. It is listed as a census-designated place (CDP) by the U.S. Census Bureau. As of the 2020 census, Vineyard Haven had a population of 2,747.

The area was called "Nobnocket" by the Wampanoag people and was first referred to by the colonial settlers as "Homes Hole", "Homes" from a Wampanoag term for "old man" and "Hole" meaning a sheltered inlet. By the 19th century, it was more commonly spelled "Holmes Hole", after the descendants of John Holmes (1730–1812), who had settled in the village during the second half of the 18th century. The village officially changed its name to Vineyard Haven in 1871. The name Vineyard Haven technically refers only to one section of the town of Tisbury, but the names are used interchangeably and Vineyard Haven is commonly used as a title for the whole town.

Vineyard Haven is the main port of entry to Martha's Vineyard and one of the three main population centers (with Edgartown and Oak Bluffs). The Steamship Authority wharf is located in Vineyard Haven where ferries arrive and depart year-round. (A second, seasonal wharf is located in neighboring Oak Bluffs.) The year-round population is only about 2,000 people, but that number increases tremendously in the summer.

== Geography ==
Vineyard Haven is located at 41°27′22″N 70°36′26″W.

According to the United States Census Bureau, the CDP has a total area of 4.1 km^{2} (1.6 sq mi), of which 3.2 km^{2} (1.2 sq mi) is land and 0.9 km^{2} (0.35 sq mi) (20.89%) is water.

== Demographics ==
Historical population
Census	Pop.	Note	%±
2020	2,747		—
U.S. Decennial Census

=== 2020 census ===
As of the 2020 census, Vineyard Haven had a population of 2,747. The median age was 46.3 years. 17.1% of residents were under the age of 18 and 26.0% of residents were 65 years of age or older. For every 100 females there were 92.0 males, and for every 100 females age 18 and over there were 90.9 males age 18 and over.

99.5% of residents lived in urban areas, while 0.5% lived in rural areas.

There were 1,137 households in Vineyard Haven, of which 23.7% had children under the age of 18 living in them. Of all households, 39.8% were married-couple households, 20.1% were households with a male householder and no spouse or partner present, and 33.6% were households with a female householder and no spouse or partner present. About 35.2% of all households were made up of individuals and 19.2% had someone living alone who was 65 years of age or older.

There were 1,750 housing units, of which 35.0% were vacant. The homeowner vacancy rate was 1.5% and the rental vacancy rate was 9.9%.

Racial composition as of the 2020 census
Race	Number	Percent
White	1,973	71.8%
Black or African American	111	4.0%
American Indian and Alaska Native	14	0.5%
Asian	28	1.0%
Native Hawaiian and Other Pacific Islander	0	0.0%
Some other race	135	4.9%
Two or more races	486	17.7%
Hispanic or Latino (of any race)	93	3.4%

=== 2000 census ===
As of the 2000 census, there were 2,048 people, 941 households, and 479 families residing in the CDP. The population density was 632.6 people /km^{2} (1,638 people/mi^{2}). There were 1,420 housing units at an average density of 438.6 units /km^{2} (1,136 units/mi^{2}). The racial makeup of the CDP was 88.92% White, 3.22% African American, 1.86% Native American, 0.20% Asian, 0.10% Pacific Islander, 1.71% from other races, and 4.00% from two or more races. Hispanic or Latino of any race were 0.63% of the population.

There were 941 households, out of which 23.1% had children under the age of 18 living with them, 37.2% were married couples living together, 10.4% had a female householder with no husband present, and 49.0% were non-families. 39.1% of all households were made up of individuals, and 14.3% had someone living alone who was 65 years of age or older. The average household size was 2.17 and the average family size was 2.93.

In the CDP, the population was spread out, with 20.6% under the age of 18, 6.3% from 18 to 24, 30.8% from 25 to 44, 25.7% from 45 to 64, and 16.7% who were 65 years of age or older. The median age was 41 years. For every 100 females, there were 92.3 males. For every 100 females age 18 and over, there were 86.9 males.

The median income for a household in the CDP was $37,318, and the median income for a family was $44,844. Males had a median income of $35,824 versus $28,750 for females. The per capita income for the CDP was $26,225. About 6.5% of families and 11.3% of the population were below the poverty line, including 29.2% of those under age 18 and 10.3% of those age 65 or over.

== Transportation ==
Air Service is provided from Martha's Vineyard Airport.

The most reliable source of public transportation from Vineyard Haven to the rest of the island is the Martha's Vineyard Regional Transit Authority (VTA). Almost all of the buses stop at the Vineyard Haven Steamship Authority bus terminal and it is the most used in the summer time and year-round. The VTA is the only Island-wide public transportation system on Martha's Vineyard, which makes it the best choice for traveling around the Vineyard for tourists who do not have cars and do not want to pay for a taxi.

== Notable residents ==
- Joel Greenberg, billionaire co-founder of Susquehanna International Group
- William B. Rochester, Paymaster-General of the United States Army
