= List of ships named Nantucket =

A number of ships have been named Nantucket, after the island off the Massachusetts coast, including the following:

== Naval vessels ==
- USS Nantucket (1862), a Passaic-class coastal monitor that served in the Union during the American Civil War, and sold in 1900
- USS Nantucket (IX-18), built in 1876 as USS Ranger and served as Nantucket from 1918 to 1942, as a gunboat and then a survey/school ship
- USS Nantucket (SP-1153), an 1899-built coastal passenger steamer taken up in 1917, but found unsuitable for naval service and returned to her owner
- USS Nantucket (LCS-27), a Freedom-class littoral combat ship commissioned in 2024

== Ferry service ==
- The Steamship Authority's ferry to Nantucket island has been operated by many vessels, including:
  - Nantucket (steamboat), a sidewheel steam ferry in service 1886 to 1910
  - Nantucket, the former Nobska (steamship), in service 1928 to 1956
  - SS Nantucket (1956), in service 1957 to 1974, then renamed Naushon
  - MV Nantucket, in service since 1974

== Lightships ==
- Lightship Nantucket was a lightship station marking the shoals south of the island and on which at least 11 individual lightships took station between 1854 and 1983, including:
  - LV-58 (1894–1896)
  - LV-85 (1907–1923), under US Navy control 1917–1919
  - LV-117 (1930–1934)
  - LV-112 (for periods during 1936–1975), now preserved in Boston, Massachusetts
  - WLV-613 (1967–1983)
  - WLV-612 (1975–1983) (alternated with WLV-613 in final years)

== Other ships ==
- Nantucket (1837), a whaling ship, wrecked in 1859
- Nantucket Clipper, a 1984-built cruise ship, later trading as Spirit of Nantucket
- USCGC Nantucket (WPB-1316), an Island-class patrol boat launched in 1987, and reported transferred to Ukraine in 2018
