= Uncatena =

Uncatena may refer to:

- Uncatena Island, one of the Elizabeth Islands in Gosnold, Massachusetts
- Uncatena (steamboat), a sidewheel steamer ferry of the New Bedford, Martha's Vineyard and Nantucket Steamboat Co. (1902–1928)
- MV Uncatena, a ferry of the Woods Hole, Martha's Vineyard and Nantucket Steamship Authority (1965–2008)
