= Gay Head (steamboat) =

American sidewheel steamer

- The Gay Head, circa 1897.

History

United States
- Name: Gay Head
- Namesake: Gay Head, Massachusetts
- Operator: New Bedford, Martha's Vineyard, and Nantucket Steamboat Co.
- Launched: 1891
- Out of service: 1924

General characteristics
- Type: Paddle steamer
- Displacement: 701 long tons (712 t)
- Length: 203 ft (62 m)
- Beam: 34 ft (10 m)
- Draft: 5 ft 6 in (1.68 m)
- Propulsion: Pusey and Jones steam engine

The Gay Head was a sidewheel steamer operating as a ferry serving the islands of Martha's Vineyard and Nantucket during the end of the nineteenth century and the beginning of the twentieth. It was named after the town of Gay Head, Massachusetts, later renamed Aquinnah.

== Construction ==
The Gay Head was built in 1891 in Philadelphia for the New Bedford, Martha's Vineyard, and Nantucket Steamboat Co. It was 701 tons, 203 feet long, 34 foot beam, a draft of 5½ feet, with encased paddlewheels. The engine was built by Pusey & Jones Co. in Philadelphia. It was the largest sidewheeler ever operated by the company.

According to a 1961 Vineyard Gazette article:

"Her social hall, ladies' saloon and toilet rooms were "all fitted in the Neapolitan style, with gold trimmings." The woodwork was of cherry, and the side seats in the cabins were covered with maroon plush upholstering. The social hall deck was laid with black walnut and maple - its size, too, was imposing, for its length was 50 feet. Above the main deck were the forward promenade and upper saloon, reached fore and aft by "richly carved staircases." Five state rooms on each side were furnished with willow furniture. The Gay Head could boast a hurricane deck extending from the stern to the pilot house; this was something earlier steamers had lacked."

== Career ==
Postcard image of the Gay Head

Gay Head was commanded initially in 1891 by Capt. A. P. Bartow and Capt. G. L. Daggett, and later by Capt. Charles H. Fishback of Nantucket, Capt. Charles H. Coulter (resigned 1909), and Capt. J. W. Merriman.

In July 1898, the Gay Head collided with the steamer Nantucket while crossing Vineyard Sound in a dense fog. The Nantucket's bow was badly damaged in the accident.

The Gay Head operated until 1924, after 33 years of operation.
