= Island Home (steamboat) =

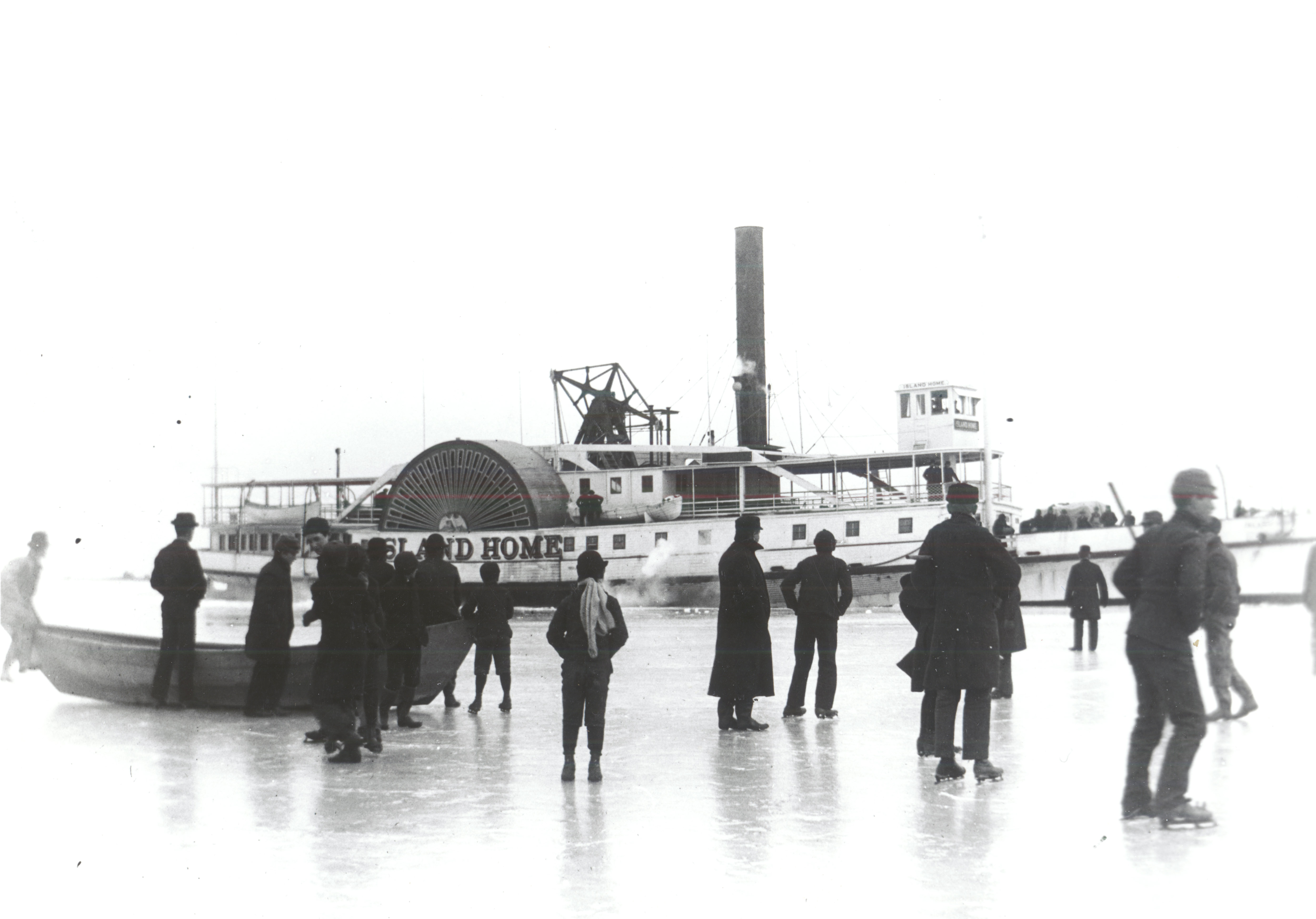
- Island Home

History

United States
- Name: Island Home
- Operator: Nantucket and Cape Cod Steamboat Company
- In service: September 1855
- Out of service: 1895 or 1896
- Fate: Sold; Struck ice floe and sank, 1902

General characteristics
- Type: Passenger ferry
- Tonnage: 536 tons
- Length: 184 ft (56 m)
- Beam: 29 ft 8 in (9.04 m)
- Propulsion: 1 × 120 nhp vertical beam steam engine

Island Home circa 1895.

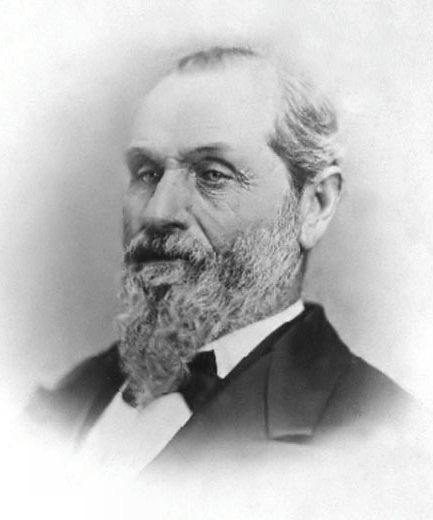
Captain Thomas Brown.

The Island Home was a sidewheel steamer operating as a ferry serving the islands of Martha's Vineyard and Nantucket during the second half of the nineteenth century.

== Nantucket ferry service ==
Island Home was built in 1855 in Greenpoint, New York. Its machinery was manufactured at the Morgan Iron Works in New York. Leonard Merritt, superintending engineer of the New Haven Steamboat Company, supervised the machinery construction.

Island Home first arrived at Nantucket on September 5, 1855 under the command of Capt. Thomas Brown. It was the first purchase of the new Nantucket and Cape Cod Steamboat Co., which had been formed from the Nantucket Steamboat Co. earlier that year when the new railroad terminus wharf was built in Hyannis, Massachusetts. It was 184 feet long, with a 29'8" beam and measured 536 tons. It initially sailed the waters between Hyannis and Nantucket. Capt. Brown had previously commanded the island ferry steamers Eagle's Wing and Massachusetts. He was followed by Capt. Nathan Manter (1818–1897), who commanded the Island Home for thirty years.

Island Home is listed in the American Lloyd's Register of American and Foreign Shipping during 1859-1863 as a 450-ton, single-decked vessel. The 1858 New-York Marine Register lists the Island Home as a 536-ton vessel.

Island Home sailed the Nantucket-Hyannis route until the completion of the Woods Hole branch of the Old Colony Railroad in 1872; it subsequently sailed between Woods Hole and Nantucket.

== Martha's Vineyard ferry service ==
In March 1886 the Island Home became one of the initial four steamers operating for the newly organized New Bedford, Martha's Vineyard, and Nantucket Steamboat Co. (The other three were River Queen, Martha's Vineyard and Monohansett.)

== Later service ==
Island Home was sold by the New Bedford, Martha's Vineyard, and Nantucket Steamboat Co. in 1895 or 1896 (sources vary.)

Records of the Island Home resurfaced in the 1897-1900 editions of Record of American and Foreign Shipping as a 184' long, 30-ton vessel. Its owner was listed as Mt. Vernon & Marshall Hall S.B. Co., its homeport as New Bedford, and its master as Capt. N. H. Manter.

For six years or so, Island Home operated as a work barge for R.B. Little Co. of Providence. In 1902 it was damaged by an ice floe off New Jersey or Rhode Island (sources vary) and sank.

== Reuse of name ==
In 2007, a new diesel-powered car ferry named MV Island Home started service between Martha's Vineyard and Woods Hole. It was named after this 19th-century steamer.
