= Nobska (steamship) =

Steamship on Nantucket Sound

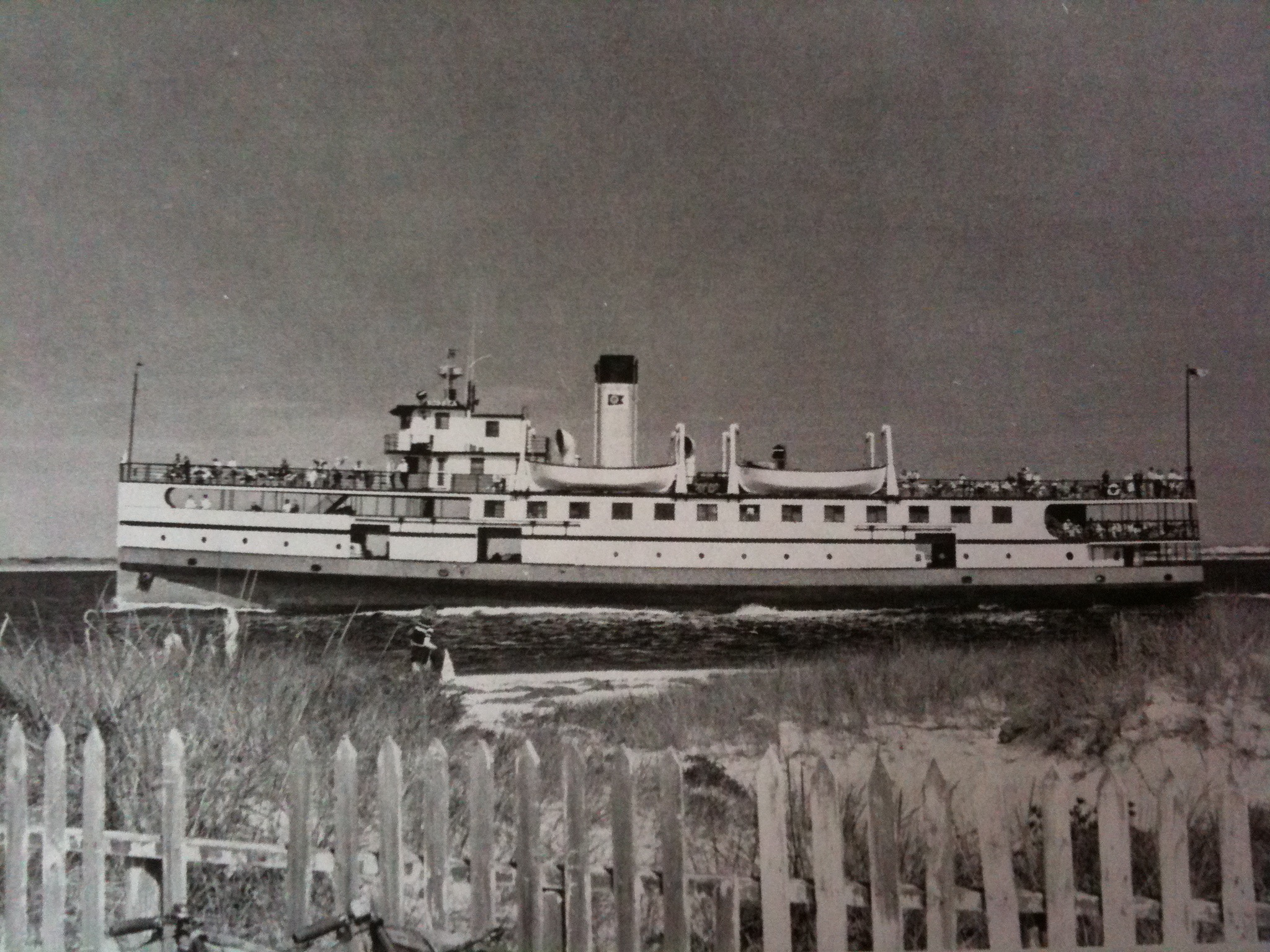
- The Nobska, possibly headed out of Nantucket harbor after just rounding Brant Point.

History
- Name: SS Nobska
- Owner: The Woods Hole, Martha's Vineyard and Nantucket Steamship Authority
- Operator: The Woods Hole, Martha's Vineyard and Nantucket Steamship Authority
- Builder: Bath Iron Works, Maine
- Launched: 24 March 1925
- Completed: 1925
- In service: 1925
- Out of service: 1973
- Fate: Scrapped in 2006

General characteristics
- Tonnage: 1,085 gross register tons
- Length: 210 ft (64 m)
- Beam: 50 ft (15 m)
- Draft: 9 ft 3 in (2.82 m)
- Installed power: Steam (coal)
- Propulsion: Single screw
- Speed: 14 knots (26 km/h/16 mph)
- Capacity: 1,200
- NOBSKA (steamship)
- U.S. National Register of Historic Places
- Location: Inner harbor, Baltimore, Maryland
- Area: 0 acres (0 ha)
- Built: 1925
- Built by: Bath Ironworks
- Architectural style: Sponson design
- NRHP reference No.: 74002216
- Added to NRHP: May 2, 1974

The Nobska was a steamship that plied the waters of Nantucket Sound as part of The Woods Hole, Martha's Vineyard and Nantucket Steamship Authority's fleet between 1925 and 1973 as a ferry. She was eventually scrapped in 2006 despite efforts to save her. She was America's last East Coast coastal steamer, had been on the National Register of Historic Places in Maryland, and had been considered one of America's 10 most endangered maritime resources by the National Maritime Alliance and National Trust for Historic Preservation.

== Construction and service ==
Built in 1925 at the Bath Iron Works in Maine, the Nobska was named after Nobska Point, Woods Hole, on Cape Cod in Massachusetts.

Two hundred and ten feet long, she had a four-cylinder triple-expansion steam engine and could make 14 knots. She ran many different routes for the Steamship Authority over her decades of service for southeastern Massachusetts, mainly for the Cape and Islands but also including New Bedford.

Although launched as the Nobska, from 1928 to 1956 she was named the Nantucket. Since she was renamed Nobska in 1956, two other Steamship Authority vessels have had that name: the later Naushon, and the current Nantucket itself.

She was considered elegant and, at the time of her launch, modern, "the queen of the Sounds." In 2006 one reporter wrote that "She embodied style, grace and modern technology, and was an immediate hit with the Islanders she served," and that she was "beloved" by many during her years of service. In her later years she was "the grand lady of the ferry service."

One story often told from her service years was when, in February 1961, Nantucket island was iced in and no ferries were able to make the trip. The Nobska, with its sharp bow, was sent to break through the ice and did so, although she was then iced in over the weekend. Other stories can be found at the NESF site.

== End of service ==
The Nobska ended her service in 1973, taking her last trip for the Steamship Authority on September 18 of that year, and was added to the National Register of Historic Places in 1974. She was sold off in 1975, and was converted to a floating restaurant in Baltimore, which did not work out. The Nobska sat derelict for over a decade until Friends of the Nobska, a group created to save the ship, was able to purchase her in 1988.

=== Friends of the Nobska ===
The Friends of the Nobska, organized in 1975 and later renamed the New England Steamship Foundation (NESF), was a non-profit group specifically created to save the Nobska. However the NESF experienced fundraising problems, legal battles, a scandal involving fundraising, and bankruptcy.

=== Scrapping ===
In 2006, the Nobska had sat for ten years in a dry dock at the historic Charlestown Navy Yard, but the slip was needed for work on other historical vessels such as the USS Constitution and the USS Cassin Young (DD-793). The Nobska needed to be removed, intact or in pieces. The Friends of the Nobska were unable to raise the funds to finish the necessary work, and the Nobska was ordered scrapped by the National Park Service. She had been the last surviving American coastal steamer.

=== Whistle and engine survive ===
The Eagle, with the Nobska's whistle, shown here in Nantucket harbor, 2009.

Some of the ship had been removed for restoration, such as the massive engine and the ship's steam whistle.

In 2006 the Steamship Authority installed the Nobska's whistle on their modern vessel the Eagle (built in 1987), although it is now air-powered instead of steam-powered, and put a recording of the whistle on their website.

In 2024 the steam engine and other Nobska artifacts were moved to the New England Wireless and Steam Museum in East Greenwich, Rhode Island. The NEWSM plans to restore the steam engine so that it can be demonstrated running under steam.

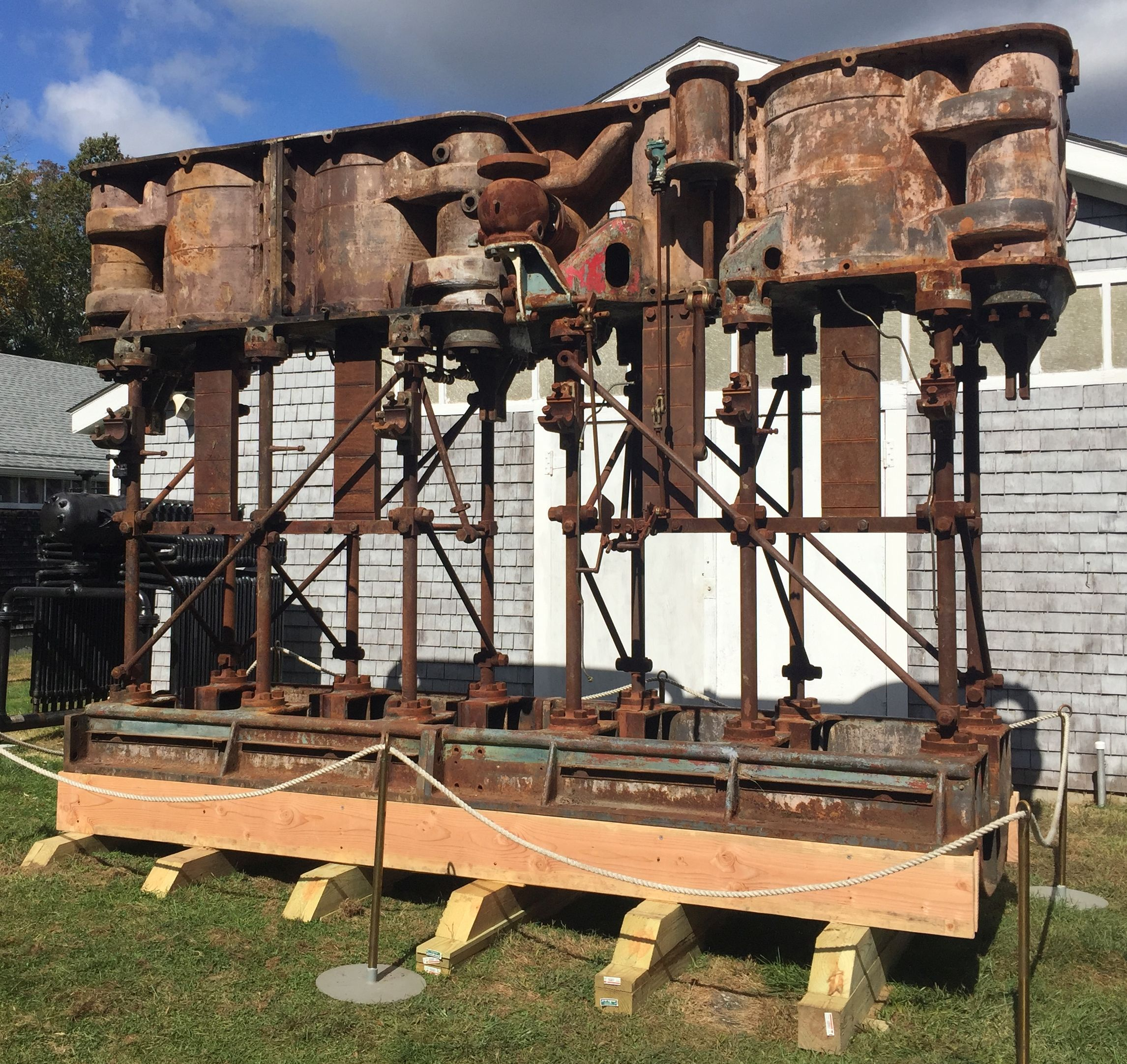
The Nobska Steam Engine is now located at the New England Wireless and Steam Museum in East Greenwich, Rhode Island, USA

== See also ==
- SS Nantucket (1957)
