= MV Gran Cacique IV =

High-speed passenger ferry in Venezuela

MV Gran Cacique IV is a high speed passenger ferry that is operated in Venezuela by Gran Cacique II. She originally operated for the Woods Hole, Martha's Vineyard and Nantucket Steamship Authority as Flying Cloud.

She was built by Derecktor Shipyards at a cost of $8 million and entered service in 2000. Almost immediately after delivery, she began to experience engine failures, which plagued her for most of her Steamship Authority service. She received new engines before her final year in operation for the Authority in 2006, by which point she had missed over 800 scheduled trips. She was replaced by MV Iyanough in 2007. In June 2008, Gran Cacique II purchased Flying Cloud for $3.9 million, after which she was renamed to Gran Cacique IV in 2011.

Gran Cacique IV is 134.5 feet (41.0 m) long, with a service speed of 36 knots (41 mph), and has a passenger capacity of 300.
