= Martha's Vineyard (steamboat) =

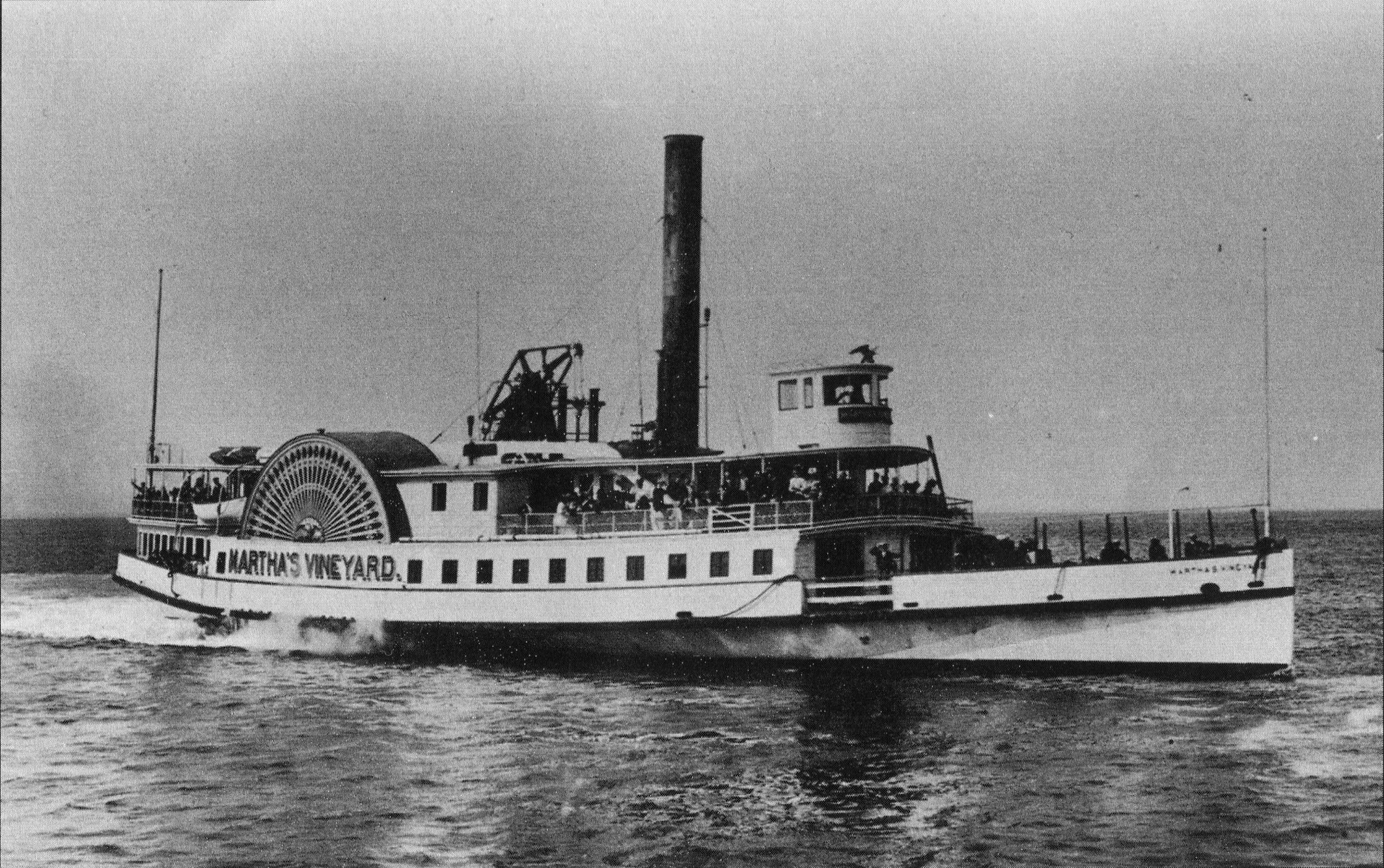
- Martha's Vineyard

History
- Name: Martha's Vineyard
- Builder: Lawrence & Foulks (Williamsburg, NY)
- Completed: 1871
- Renamed: Keyport (1913)
- Fate: Sunk in collision in New York Harbor, 1916

General characteristics
- Type: Sidewheel passenger steamboat
- Tonnage: 515
- Length: 185 ft (56 m)
- Beam: 29 ft (8.8 m)
- Propulsion: Vertical beam

Martha's Vineyard was a sidewheel steamer operating as a ferry serving the island of Martha's Vineyard during the second half of the nineteenth century.

== Construction and design ==
Martha's Vineyard, a wooden-hulled sidewheel steamboat, was built by Lawrence & Foulks in Williamsburg, New York, in 1871. It was a 515-ton vessel, 185 feet long, with a 29' beam.

A 1961 Vineyard Gazette article noted the beauty of the vessel: "The Martha's Vineyard...had decorated paddleboxes that made large, rhythmic and beautiful half-circles on the sides." as well as how exposed it was: " The Martha's Vineyard at first had no hurricane deck open to passengers, and eventually only a partial one." The same article also adds a quotation from 1871:

"The cabins, saloons, ante-rooms, etc., are comfortable and roomy, and finished in a handsome manner. The lower cabin, which extends from the stern to the after end of the engine, has locker seats on the sides, and the kitchen and stewards' rooms are adjoining, on each side of the engine. There is a flight of stairs, black walnut, from the after part of the cabin to the ladies' saloon, as well as a similar flight from the forward part. This saloon is nearly double the size of that of the Monohansett, and its ample space is handsomely carpeted and finished in a very tasteful manner. A flight of double circular stairs, of black walnut, aft of the engine, connects with the promenade saloon, which is 90 feet in length, extending from the stern to the forward gangway. The saloon is enclosed with broad handsome windows, opening on the guards and there is an open promenade deck fore and aft. A handsome carpet covers the floor of the saloon, and black walnut seats encompass the magnificent room. There is a handsome dome over the stairway with fancy glass windows. The painting and panel work of the saloon is particularly outstanding."

== Service history ==
From 1871 until 1886, the Martha's Vineyard and the Monohansett were the only two ferries serving Martha's Vineyard.

In March 1886 the Martha's Vineyard became one of the initial four steamers operating for the newly organized New Bedford, Martha's Vineyard, and Nantucket Steamboat Co. (The other three were River Queen, Island Home and the Monohansett.)

In 1928, the steam-powered ferry Islander, which had begun service in 1923, was renamed Martha's Vineyard. It operated until at least the 1940s.

In 1993, a new diesel-powered ferry named MV Martha's Vineyard started its service to Martha's Vineyard and Woods Hole. It is the third vessel to be named after Martha's Vineyard.

=== Gallery ===
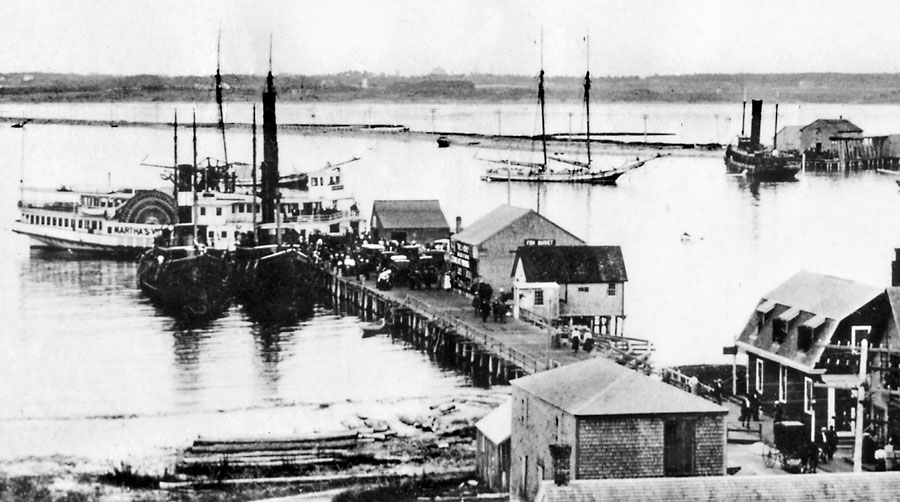
Martha's Vineyard at Union Wharf in Vineyard Haven, MA in 1900.

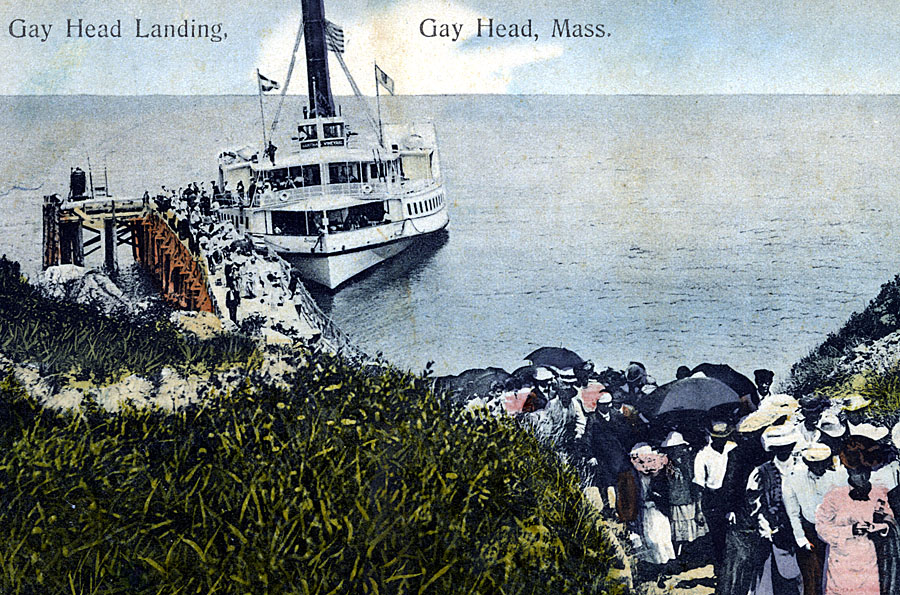
Postcard image of Martha's Vineyard at Gay Head Landing in Aquinnah, MA circa 1907-1917.

Martha's Vineyard, from an 1890s souvenir booklet.

== Notes ==
- Reprint of a 1906 article in the Vineyard Gazette
- Reprint of a 1940 article in the Vineyard Gazette
- Vineyard Gazette homepage
- Mystic Seaport - G. W. Blunt White Library - Ship & Yacht Register
- Banks, Charles E (1911). The History of Martha's Vineyard, Mass. Volume=I. Dukes County Historical Society.
- The Steamship Authority
