= River Queen (steamboat) =

Sidewheel steamer

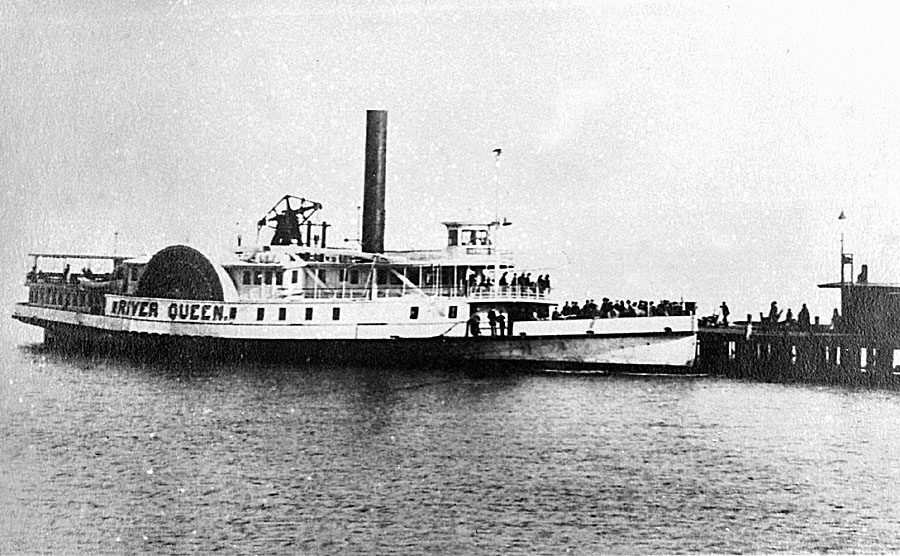
- Sidewheeler ferry River Queen

History
- Owner: Fall River lines, Vineyard Company, Nantucket & Cape Cod Steamboat Company, and Mount Vernon & Marshall Hall Steamboat Company
- Builder: Benjamin C Terry
- Completed: 1864
- Out of service: 1911
- Fate: Burned to the waterline

General characteristics
- Tonnage: 426
- Length: 181 ft (55 m)

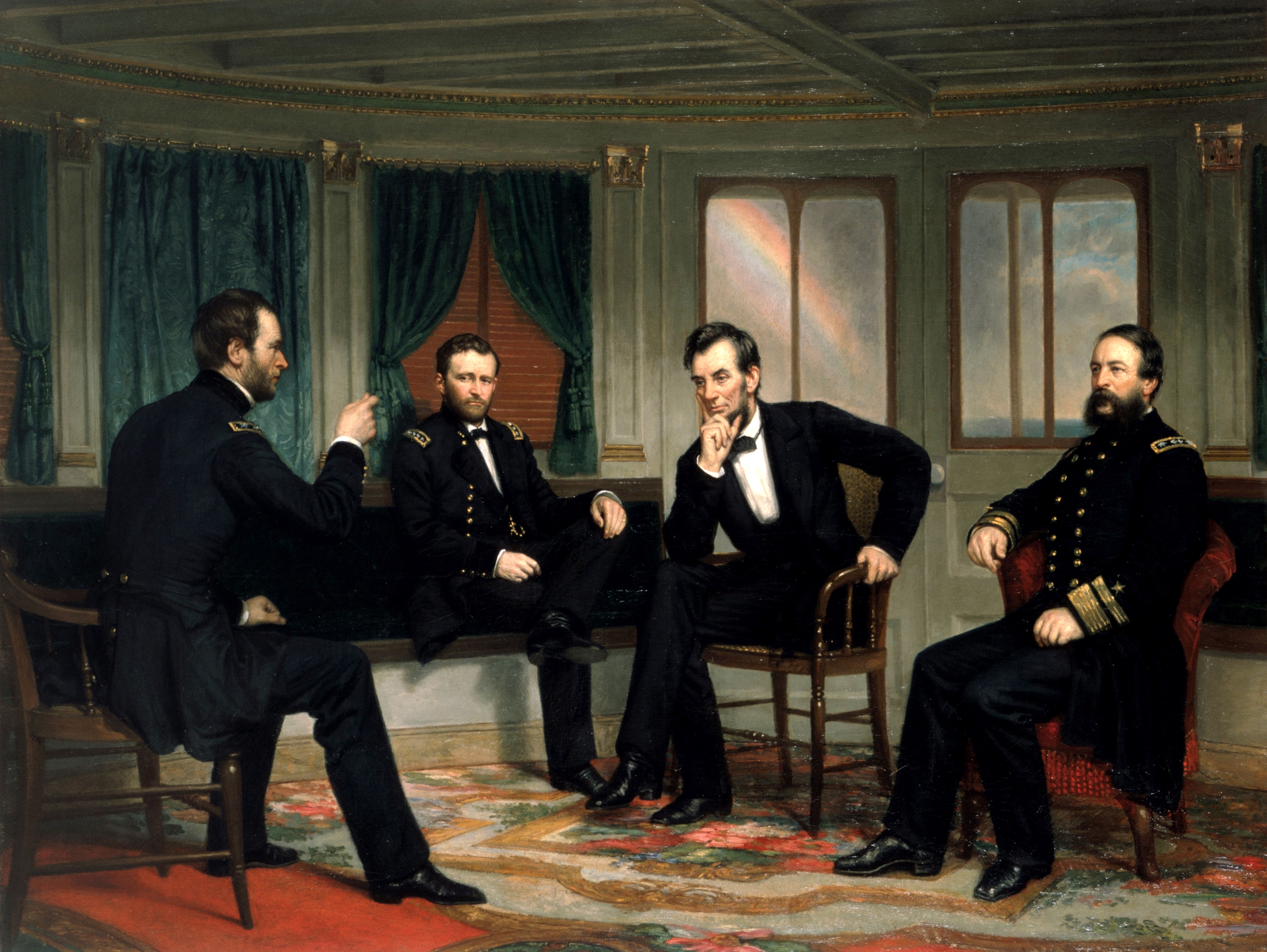
The Peacemakers by George Peter Alexander Healy, 1868, depicts the historic 1865 meeting on the River Queen

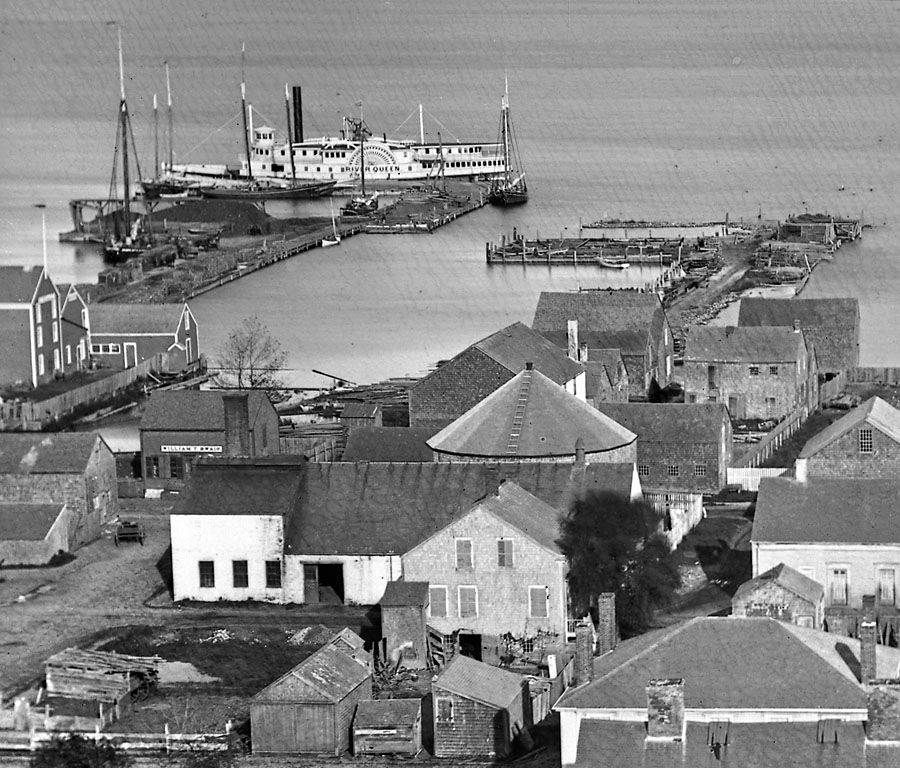
Sidewheeler ferry River Queen at the wharf in Nantucket, probably during U.S. Grant's nostalgic visit aboard the historic steamer on Aug. 27, 1874.

The River Queen was a sidewheel steamer launched in 1864. It soon became closely associated with President Abraham Lincoln and General Ulysses S. Grant while operating on the Potomac River, and was used for an unsuccessful peace conference in 1865 during the last year of the American Civil War. Later it operated as a ferry serving the islands of Martha's Vineyard and Nantucket during the late 19th century. Late in its career, it returned to the Potomac as an excursion vessel, and in 1911, it was destroyed in a fire.

== Construction ==
River Queen was built at Keyport, New Jersey, in 1864. She was initially owned by Alfred Van Santvoord, and later was one of four steamers operating for the New Bedford, Martha's Vineyard, and Nantucket Steamboat Co when that concern was organized in March 1886. (The other three vessels were Island Home, Martha's Vineyard and Monohansett.) River Queen had sailed this route since 1871 for the company's predecessors.

== Civil War service ==
Chartered by the U.S. Department of War, the River Queen was used by General Ulysses S. Grant as his private dispatch boat on the Potomac River in 1865. On February 3, 1865, the Hampton Roads Conference took place on the River Queen in an unsuccessful attempt to negotiate an end to the American Civil War. While the conference was being held in the saloon of the ship, the River Queen was lashed to the Mary Martin, another ship.

In March 1865, Abraham Lincoln met with General William T. Sherman, Rear Admiral David Dixon Porter and General Grant aboard the River Queen to discuss strategy for the end of the Civil War. Both Lincoln and Grant liked this vessel; Lincoln rode aboard her two days before his assassination in April. Capt. Nathan B. Saunders of the Fall River steamer line was captain of the River Queen during its Civil War service.

== Ferry career ==
After the war, River Queen was operated by the Newport Steamboat Company between Providence, R.I. and Newport, R.I. The American Lloyd's Register of American and Foreign Shipping during 1865–1872 records the River Queen as a 500-ton vessel with a homeport in Providence. Its owner was listed as R. Buffon and its master as Capt. Williams.

River Queen was sold by the New Bedford, Martha's Vineyard, and Nantucket Steamboat Co. in 1893 to the Mount Vernon & Marshall Hall Steamboat Co. of Washington, D.C. During 1897–1900 the Record of American and Foreign Shipping lists the River Queen as a 181' long, 426-ton sidewheeler hailing out of New Bedford, owned by "Mt. Vernon & Marshall Hall S. B. Co." and under the command of a Capt. Wood.

River Queen was still operating in 1910 on the Potomac River, by that time among the oldest side-wheelers still in service. In July 1911, newspapers reported the burning of the River Queen "to the water's edge" following the explosion of a signal lantern on board. The press reported that "For the past year or two the River Queen has been used as an excursion boat for Negroes."

== In popular culture ==
In the 2012 film Lincoln, the Hampton Roads Conference is depicted and several scenes take place on board the River Queen. They were shot on an indoor set.
