= MV Island Home =

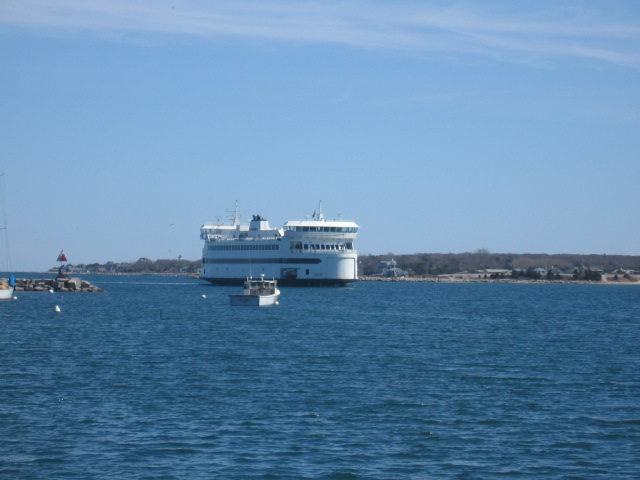
- Namesake: Island Home
- Owner: Steamship Authority
- Route: Woods Hole–Martha's Vineyard
- Builder: VT Halter Marine
- Cost: $32.1 million
- Laid down: April 27, 2005
- Maiden voyage: March 5, 2007
- Home port: Woods Hole, Massachusetts
- Status: In service

General characteristics
- Length: 255 ft (78 m)
- Speed: 16 knots (30 km/h; 18 mph)
- Capacity: 1,200 people, 76 cars

MV Island Home is a ferry built by VT Halter Marine in 2005 for the Steamship Authority. She replaced the MV Islander (1950) on the Authority's route between Woods Hole and Vineyard Haven. She has been serving the Woods Hole–Martha's Vineyard route since her maiden voyage on March 5, 2007.

The Island Home is different from most vessels in the Steamship Authority fleet in that she is a double-ended ferry and does not have to turn around before entering a slip.

Island Home was named after the sidewheel steamer Island Home which served Martha's Vineyard for most of the second half of the nineteenth century.

Her keel was laid on April 27, 2005 and she was launched on July 21, 2006. Her final construction cost was $32.1 million.

Island Home was built to a plan by the Elliott Bay Design Group, and has a capacity of 1,200 people and 76 vehicles, with a loaded displacement tonnage of about 1,950 tonnes and a gross tonnage of 4,311. She is powered by two Electro-Motive diesel engines, and has a top speed of 16 knots (18 mph).

In October 2007, Island Home experienced a minor collision when the MV Governor struck her while departing Woods Hole; damage to both vessels was minimal.

At approximately 9:15 AM Wednesday July 8, 2026, at the Steamship Authority’s Vineyard Haven Terminal, a white minivan drove at a high rate of speed onto the vehicle deck of the M/V Island Home prior to boarding. The vehicle traversed the length of the deck, which was empty at the time, and hit the vessel’s stern loading doors on the far side of the deck. Vessel personnel immediately responded to the situation, along with local and state law enforcement and emergency personnel. One individual in the vehicle was taken from the scene by emergency personnel for treatment. No other passengers or crew members were injured.
