= MV Woods Hole =

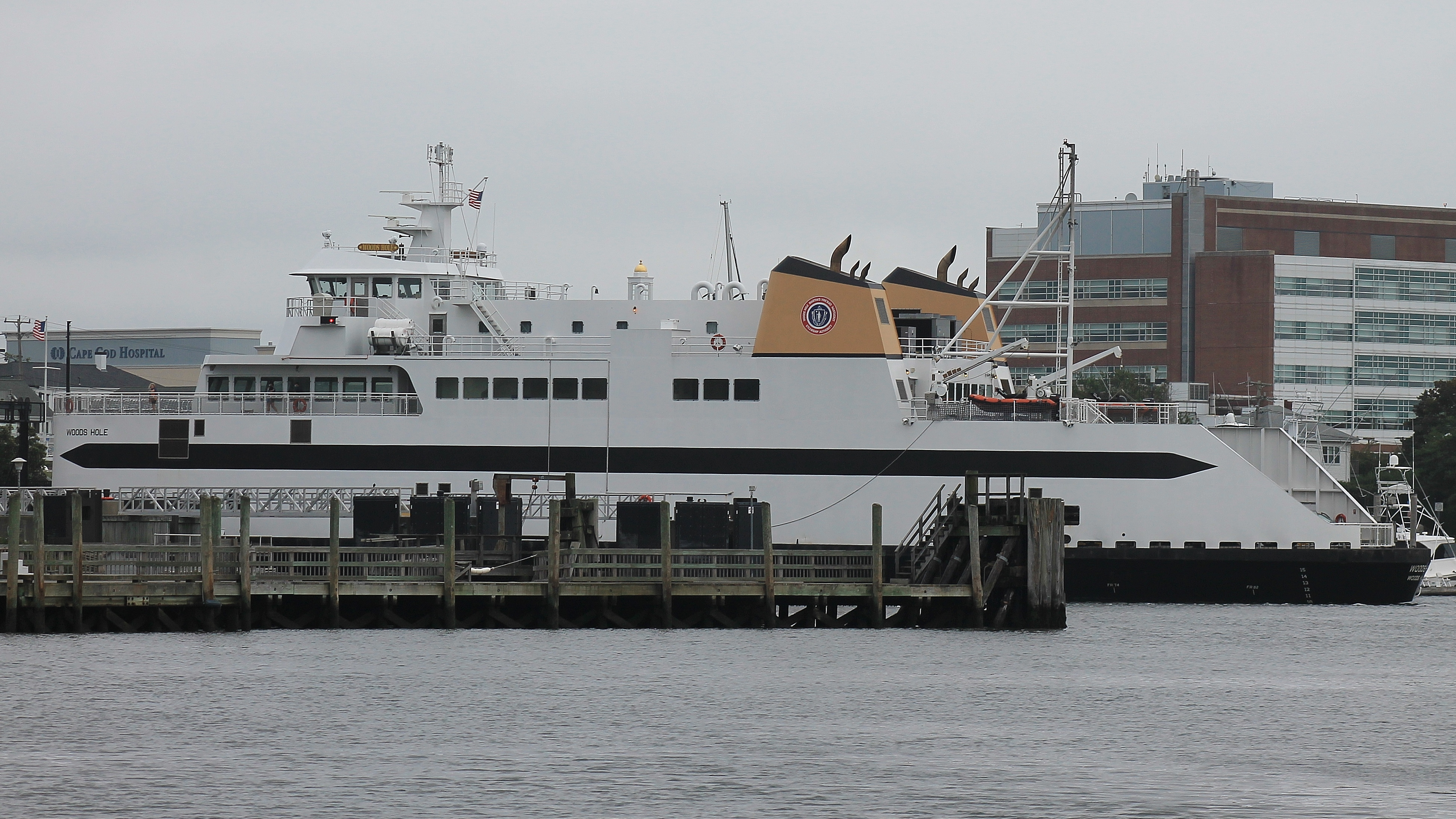
- Woods Hole docked in Hyannis, August 2021

History
- Owner: Steamship Authority
- Ordered: December 2014
- Builder: Conrad Shipyard
- Cost: $40.4 million
- Christened: May 20, 2016
- Maiden voyage: June 17, 2016
- Homeport: Woods Hole, Massachusetts
- Identification: IMO number: 9792931; MMSI number: 367691010; Callsign: WDI3700
- Status: In service

General characteristics
- Length: 235 feet (72 m)
- Beam: 64 feet (20 m)
- Draft: 10.5 feet (3.2 m)
- Speed: 14.5 knots (16.7 mph)
- Capacity: 385 people, 55 cars

MV Woods Hole is a passenger and vehicle ferry operated by the Steamship Authority.

The Authority awarded the vessel's $40.4 million construction contract to Conrad Shipyard, located in Morgan City, Louisiana, in December 2014. Construction was completed in 2016, and Woods Hole was christened on May 20, after which she underwent dockside and sea trials before traveling north to her namesake city. On June 13, she was commissioned into the Authority's fleet during a ceremony in Woods Hole, and began regular service four days later. During her first few months in operation, she displayed a tendency to generate an excessive bow wave; while not impeding her operations, the Authority made some modifications in an attempt to correct the issue.

Woods Hole was built to a design from the Elliott Bay Design Group, and is 235 feet (72 m) long, with a 64 feet (20 m) beam and a loaded draft of 10.5 feet (3.2 m). She can carry 385 people, and has a vehicle capacity of up to 10 tractor trailer trucks or 55 cars. She is powered by two MTU diesel engines, with a service speed of 14.5 knots (16.7 mph)
