= Steamship Authority =

Regulatory body for ferry operations in Massachusetts

Woods Hole, Martha's Vineyard and Nantucket Steamship Authority d/b/a The Steamship Authority
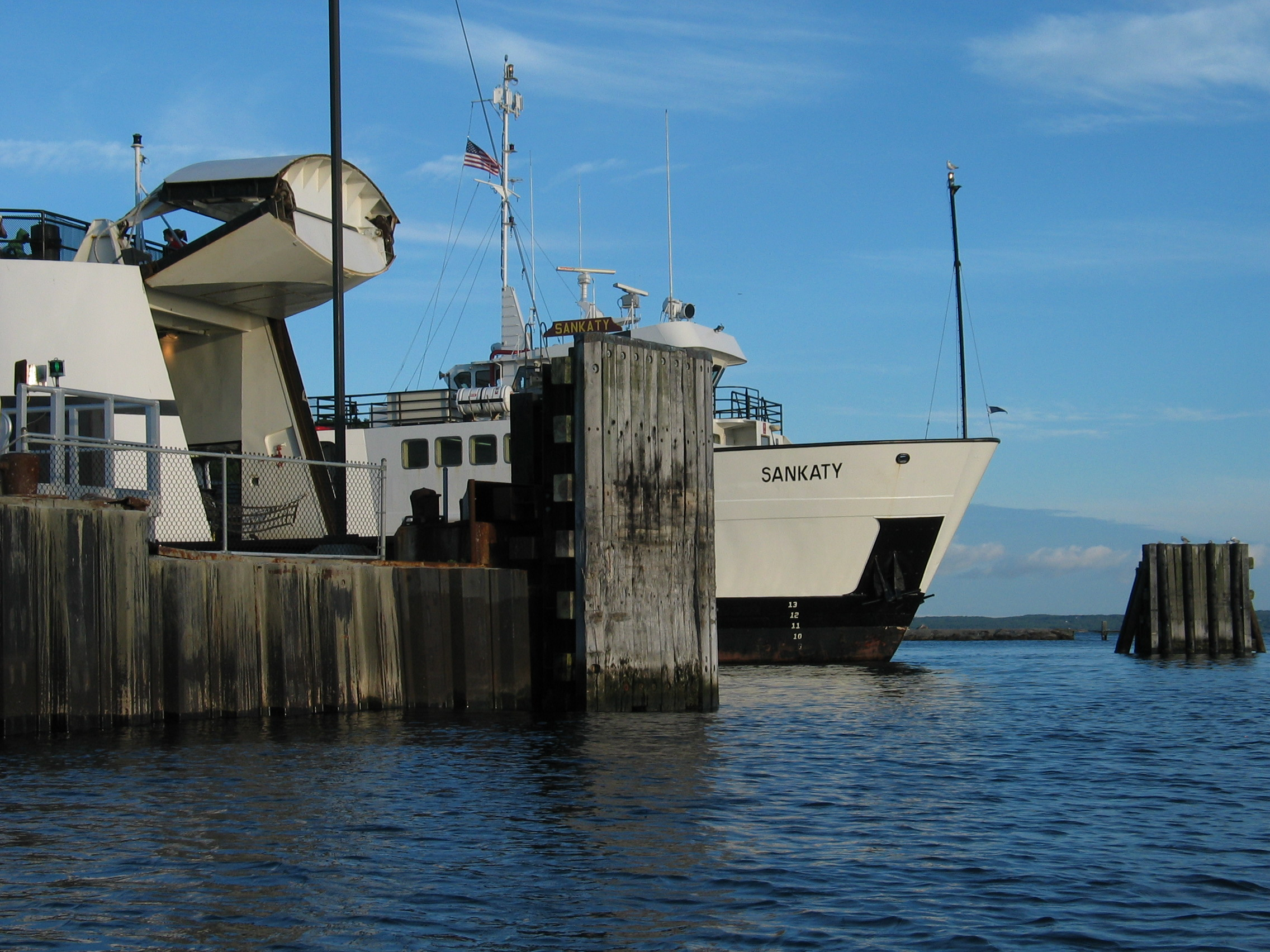
- The MV Sankaty docked at the authority's terminal in Woods Hole in 2007

Overview
- Area served: Cape Cod and the Islands
- Locale: Southeastern Massachusetts
- Transit type: Ferry
- Number of lines: 2
- Chief executive: Alex Kryska (General Manager)
- Headquarters: Falmouth, MA (regulatory body); Woods Hole, MA (ferry service)
- Website: steamshipauthority.com

Operation
- Began operation: 1960
- Number of vehicles: 10 ferry vessels

The Woods Hole, Martha's Vineyard and Nantucket Steamship Authority, doing business as The Steamship Authority (SSA), is the statutory regulatory body for all ferry operations between mainland Massachusetts and the islands of Martha's Vineyard and Nantucket, as well an operator of ferry services between the mainland and the islands. It is the only ferry operator to carry automobiles to and from the islands. The Authority also operates several freight vessels, thus serving as the main link for shipping any commercial goods that are not transported using the airports on Nantucket or Martha's Vineyard.

== History ==
=== Early Nantucket service ===
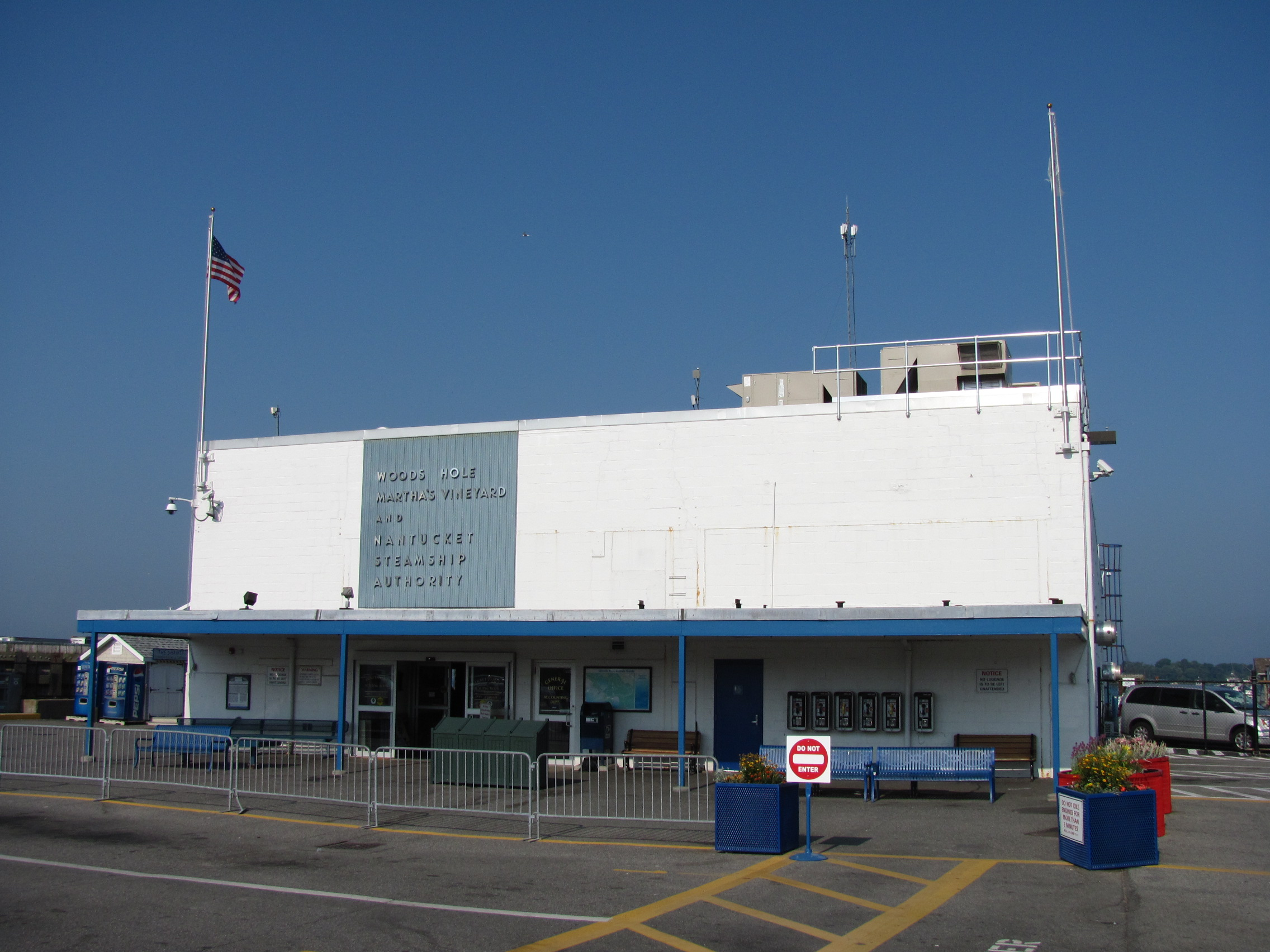
The Steamship Authority's former terminal in Woods Hole, razed in 2018.

The Steamship Authority's roots trace back to the 1833-established Nantucket Steamboat Company.

Demand for regular steamship service between Cape Cod and Nantucket increased following the opening of the Cape Cod Railroad's Hyannisport station in 1854. The same year, the company built a terminal near the rail station and renamed itself the Nantucket and Cape Cod Steamboat Company. The company's two vessels, Telegraph and Massachusetts, now began to only serve Hyannis, rather than making the longer trip to Woods Hole and New Bedford. In 1855, the steamships were replaced by the Island Home, the company's first vessel specifically engineered for the Nantucket Sound.

=== Early Martha's Vineyard service ===
Following the opening of the Hyannis terminal, the New Bedford, Vineyard and Nantucket Steamboat Company was formed in 1854 to provide service with the Eagle's Wing between the namesake destinations and Woods Hole. When the competing Island Home service began in 1885, though, Eagle's Wing ceased serving Nantucket (as well as New Bedford) due to low ridership.

The railroad station at Woods Hole, which opened in 1872, had a similar effect on steamship demand. Both the railroad and early steamboat services were at one point owned by the New York, New Haven and Hartford Railroad (NYNHH).

=== 20th century consolidation ===
The NYNHH, realizing financial troubles, sold the ferry services known at the time as the New England Steamship Company to Massachusetts Steamship Lines on December 31, 1945. In 1948, the Commonwealth of Massachusetts announced its intent to consolidate the private ferry services into a state-owned entity. This created the New Bedford, Woods Hole, Martha's Vineyard and Nantucket Steamship Authority, which began in 1949. The Massachusetts legislature dropped "New Bedford" from the company's name in 1960. The last steamship in regular service was the Nobska, which ran the Woods Hole–Nantucket route until 1973.

Several current vessels utilize names that have been a part of Island culture for many years. The "Nantucket" name has existed across four ships: the current MV Nantucket (1974-), the SS Nantucket (1957-1987, renamed Naushon in 1974), the steamboat Nobska (1925-1973, known as Nantucket from 1925 to 1958), and the original Nantucket, the which saw service from 1886 to 1910. Similarly, "Martha's Vineyard" has seen service on three vessels: the current MV Martha's Vineyard (1993-), the SS Martha's Vineyard (1923-1956, known as SS Islander until 1928), as well as the steamboat Martha's Vineyard (1871-1910). Additionally the MV Island Home (2007-), MV Sankaty (1994-), and MV Gay Head (1989-) have all seen service on older steamships, the Island Home (1855-1890), the Sankaty (1911-1924), and the Gay Head (1891-1924).

== Ferry service ==
=== Martha's Vineyard ===
Frequent passenger and auto ferry service is operated to the Martha's Vineyard towns of Vineyard Haven year round, and to Oak Bluffs from the third week of May to the third week of October from the mainland terminal in Woods Hole, Massachusetts. Sailing time is approximately 45 minutes to both Vineyard Haven and Oak Bluffs.

In early 2001, the SSA purchased the 130-foot (40 m) MV Schamonchi, along with the New Bedford-Martha's Vineyard route. She provided passenger-only service on this route until 2003, generating operating losses of about $800,000 per year. The vessel has since been sold, and a year-round high-speed catamaran service is now operated between New Bedford and Vineyard Haven (and seasonally to Oak Bluffs) by Seastreak.

=== Nantucket ===
Year round passenger and auto ferry, as well as freight service is operated to Nantucket from the mainland terminal in Hyannis, Massachusetts. Sailing time to Nantucket takes approximately 2 hours and 15 minutes. A one-hour, passenger only catamaran service, is operated with the MV Iyanough from mid April through late December from Hyannis to Nantucket. From 2000 to 2007, this service was operated with the MV Flying Cloud.

== State regulatory body ==
In addition providing ferry service, the Steamship Authority (hence the name) regulates the many commercial aspects of ferry operations to and from the Islands (those that are not regulated by the US Coast Guard). All scheduled passenger ferry operations carrying over 40 people to and from the Islands must, by law, be approved by the Steamship Authority. This generally precludes any ferry service that would directly compete with the Steamship Authority, essentially giving it a legal monopoly on all auto ferry service to the Islands.

However, approval has been granted to other companies to operate smaller passenger ferry operations to the islands, including Freedom Cruises (Harwich Port to Nantucket), Seastreak (New Bedford to Oak Bluffs and Nantucket), Rhode Island Fast Ferry (North Kingstown, Rhode Island to Oak Bluffs, the Pied Piper Edgartown Ferry (Falmouth to Edgartown).

Services established prior to May 1973, which include Hy-Line Cruises (Hyannis, Nantucket, and Oak Bluffs) and the Island Queen (Falmouth to Oak Bluffs), are allowed to provide certain services as grandfathered carriers due to their existence prior to current regulations. However, any additional new services must be licensed by the Authority.

== Governance ==
The Steamship Authority is governed by a five-person board composed of one resident from Nantucket, Martha's Vineyard, Falmouth, Barnstable, and New Bedford, with each resident confirmed by the appropriate local government entity. The board's current chair is Peter J. Jeffrey of Falmouth.

The authority also has an advisory board known as the Port Council, composed of one resident from Barnstable, Fairhaven, Falmouth, Nantucket, New Bedford, Oak Bluffs, and Tisbury. The current chair of this board is Edward Anthes-Washburn of New Bedford.

== Fleet ==
The Steamship Authority currently operates ten vessels. Six passenger ferries are predominantly used for transporting passengers and personal cargo, five of which also accept cars and trucks. The remaining three ferries are open-top and primarily used for larger trucks and freight, although ordinary passengers and automobiles are usually allowed, space permitting.

Vessels are maintained at a facility on South Street in Fairhaven, Massachusetts.

Image	Vessel	Service began	Type	Route(s) served	Notes
	MV Nantucket	1974	ROPAX	Hyannis–Nantucket (winters); Woods Hole–Martha's Vineyard (year-round)	Built in Jacksonville
	MV Eagle	1987	ROPAX	Hyannis–Nantucket (year-round)	Built by McDermott Shipyard (Morgan City)
	MV Martha's Vineyard	1993	ROPAX	Woods Hole–Martha's Vineyard (year-round)	Built by Atlantic Marine (Jacksonville)
	MV Sankaty	1994	Freight	Woods Hole–Martha's Vineyard	Built in 1981 by Rysco Shipyard, backup freight vessel
	MV Governor	1998	Freight	Woods Hole–Martha's Vineyard	Backup passenger vessel, formerly Governor's Island ferry
	MV Island Home	2007	ROPAX	Woods Hole–Martha's Vineyard (year-round)	Built by VT Halter Marine (Moss Point)
	MV Iyanough	2007	Passenger	Hyannis–Nantucket (summers)	High-speed catamaran, built by Gladding-Hearn Shipbuilding (Somerset), named after Hyannis sachem Iyannough
	MV Woods Hole	2016	ROPAX	Hyannis–Nantucket (summers); Woods Hole–Martha's Vineyard (year-round)	Built by Conrad Shipyard (Morgan City)
	MV Barnstable	2024	Freight	Hyannis-Nantucket (year-round)	
	MV Aquinnah	2025	Freight	Woods Hole-Martha’s Vineyard (year-round)	

=== Historic fleet ===
This list includes earlier vessels that were operated by private companies, many of which were incorporated into the modern Steamship Authority.

Image	Vessel	Service began	Service ended	Notes
	Eagle	1818	1818	First commercial steamboat service to Nantucket, sailed from New Bedford from May to September until being sold due to low ridership
	Connecticut	1824	1824	Operated for two months
	Hamilton	1828	1828	Operated for two months, ceased service due to low ridership
	Marco Bozzaris	1829	1832	
	Telegraph	1832	1858	Replaced by Island Home
	Massachusetts	1842	1858	Replaced by Island Home
	Naushon	1846	1848	Renamed News Boy after sale
	Canonicus	1851	1861	
	George Law	1854	1854	Chartered for one month
	Metacomet	1854	1854	
	Eagle's Wing	1854	1861	Destroyed in a fire, engine was salvaged for the Monohansett
	Island Home	1855	1890	Namesame of the modern MV Island Home, later converted to a coal barge
	Jersey Blue	1856	1857	
	Sarah Stevens	1860		
	Monohansett	1862	1902	Chartered by the federal government to carry dispatches to U.S. Navy ships in the American Civil War from August 1862 to June 1865
	Martha's Vineyard	1871	1910	
	River Queen	1871	1893	Purchased from the Newport Steamboat Company, sold to the Mount Vernon & Marshall Hall Steamboat Company
	Nantucket	1886	1910	Namesake of the modern MV Nantucket
	Gay Head	1891	1924	Built to replace Island Home
	Uncatena	1902	1928	Last sidewheeler in service, built to replace Monohansett
	Sankaty	1911	1924	Built to replace Martha's Vineyard, sold to the New England Steamship Company
	SS Islander (1923–28); SS Martha's Vineyard (1928–56)	1923	1956	Built to replace Gay Head, sold to Rhode Island Steamship Lines
	Nobska (1925–28, 1956–73); Nantucket (1928–56)	1925	1973	Whistle installed on the Eagle in 1987, sold to Friends of Nobska in 1988
	New Bedford	1928	1942	Requisitioned by the War Shipping Administration and participated in the Invasion of Normandy
	Naushon	1929	1942	Requisitioned by the War Shipping Administration and participated in the Invasion of Normandy
	Mercury			
	Gay Head (LSM 286)	1947		
	Islander	1947	c. 1951	Built in 1901, originally the Hackensack
	MV Islander (1950)	1950	2007	First diesel vessel, sold to Governor's Island
	SS Nantucket (1957–74); Naushon (1974-87)	1957	1987	Sold to Bay State Cruises
	MV Uncatena	1965	1993	Lengthened by 52 feet in 1971, sold to Casino Miami and renamed Entertainer
	Auriga	1973	c. 1989	
	MV Katama	1988	2024	Sold to Robert B. Our Company
	MV Gay Head	1989	2024	Sold to Robert B. Our Company
	Flying Cloud	2000	2007	Catamaran high-speed ferry, sold to Gran Cacique in 2008 and now the MV Gran Cacique IV in Venezuela
	Schamonchi	2001	2003	Built in 1978, sold into private ownership in 2005

== Accidents and incidents ==
In 2007, it was reported that Steamship Authority and Hy-Line ferries were dumping sewage into Nantucket Sound. The process was legal as ferries are permitted to release waste once 3 miles (4.8 km) offshore. The authority later announced it would pump sewage off ferries at its terminals, which it did so beginning in 2011.

During the first four months of 2018, 549 ferry trips were cancelled between Martha's Vineyard and Falmouth due to mechanical problems on the ferry boats. The majority of the mechanical problems occurred on the Woods Hole-Vineyard Haven route. The rate of cancellations in 2018 was approximately 15 times the yearly average of breakdowns and cancellations. A private consultant brought in to find the underlying cause behind the cancellations found mismanagement with "penny wise, pound foolish" investments and competing factions within the organization.

On the night of June 16, 2017, Iyanough crashed into a jetty in Hyannis harbor, injuring fifteen of the fifty-seven people aboard.

The Steamship Authority was the victim of a ransomware attack on June 2, 2021, which affected the ticketing and reservation system. The Steamship Authority did not pay a ransom, and the website was operational again by June 12.
