= Mhoon Landing, Mississippi =

- Unincorporated community
- Location within Mississippi
- Coordinates: 34°44′30″N 90°26′31″W
- Country: United States
- State: Mississippi
- County: Tunica
- Elevation: 194 ft (59 m)
- Time zone: UTC-6 (Central (CST))
  - Summer (DST): UTC-5 (CDT)
- ZIP code: 38676
- Area code: 662
- GNIS feature ID: 692069

Mhoon Landing is an unincorporated community located on the Mississippi River in Tunica County, Mississippi, United States. It is approximately 6 miles (9.7 km) northwest of North Tunica and approximately 12 miles (19 km) southwest of Tunica Resorts.

== History ==
The landing was named in 1859 for Feyton Mhoon (nicknamed "Faithful"), an African-American settler who each night would take his wagon to Rabbit Island, north of Mhoon Landing, and place a lantern in the lighthouse for river boats to see. Commodities would be ferried by barge to and from Rabbit Island, and Mhoon would transport them to the market in Austin.

During the Great Mississippi Flood of 1927, Mhoon Landing served as a Red Cross headquarters.

The land surrounding Mhoon Landing was rarely used as farmland due to its proximity to the Mississippi River and the high risk of flooding. In the early 1990s, it was one of Tunica County's least expensive land acreages.

== Casinos ==
In 1992, "Splash" casino opened in Mhoon Landing, the first casino in Northern Mississippi. Splash was so successful that patrons waited in line up to three hours to enter, then paid a $10 admission fee. Within a year, three other casinos opened — "Lady Luck", "President", and "Bally's" — located on ships docked at Mhoon Landing. By 1995, Splash had closed, President and Bally's had sailed closer to Memphis, and Splash was closed and in dry dock. Soon, larger casinos in Tunica Resorts gained control of the market. Lady Luck casino left Mhoon Landing in April 1994 after only seven months of operation and moved south to the spot at the U.S. Route 49 highway crossing to Helena, Arkansas before Splash closed. In 2004, a company brought the former SS Nantucket up from Biloxi with the intent of opening the "Splash Back Casino". It languished in a spot with almost no water until it was dismantled in 2012.

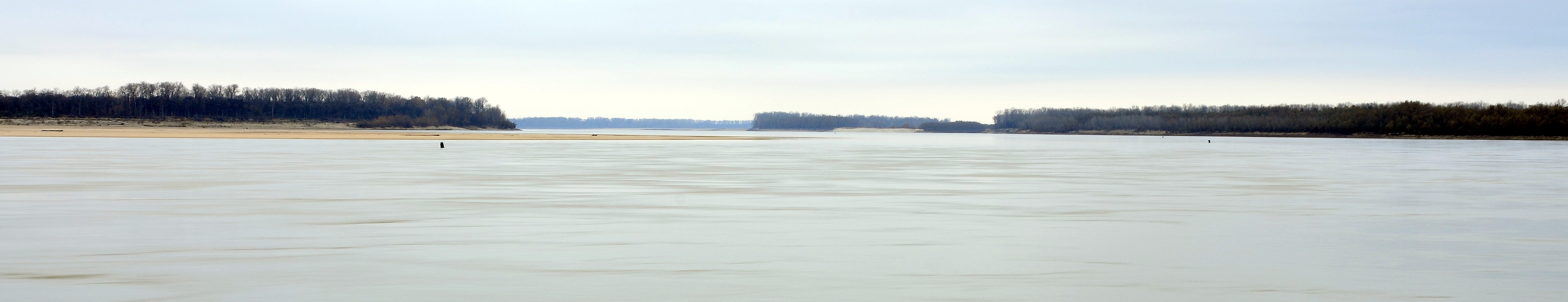
Mississippi River from Mhoon Landing

== Today ==
The riverside area south of the former casinos has been developed into the Mhoon Landing Park, a city park with a walking track, playground, and picnic pavilions.

== Gallery ==
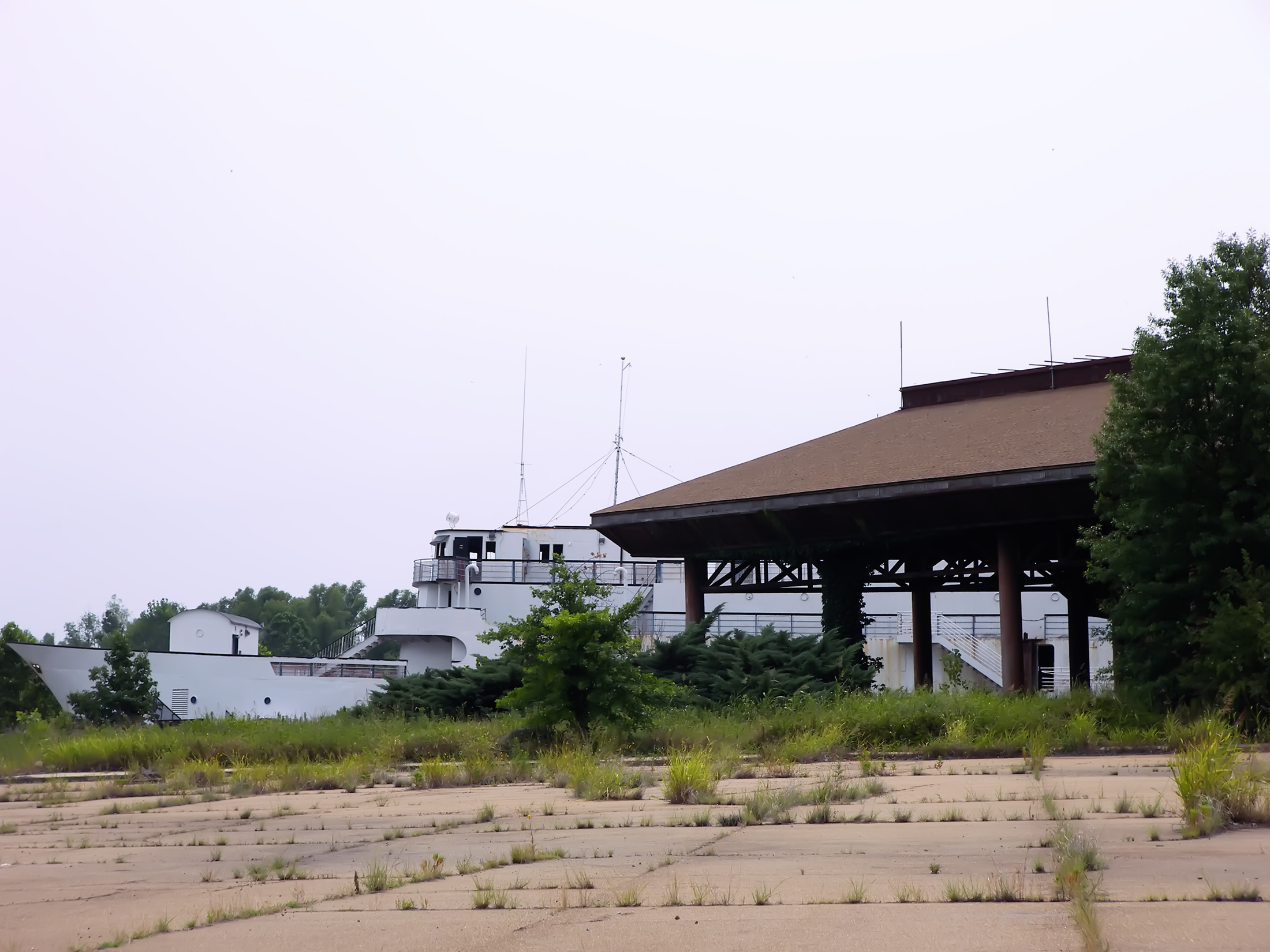
SS Nantucket at Mhoon Landing, 2007

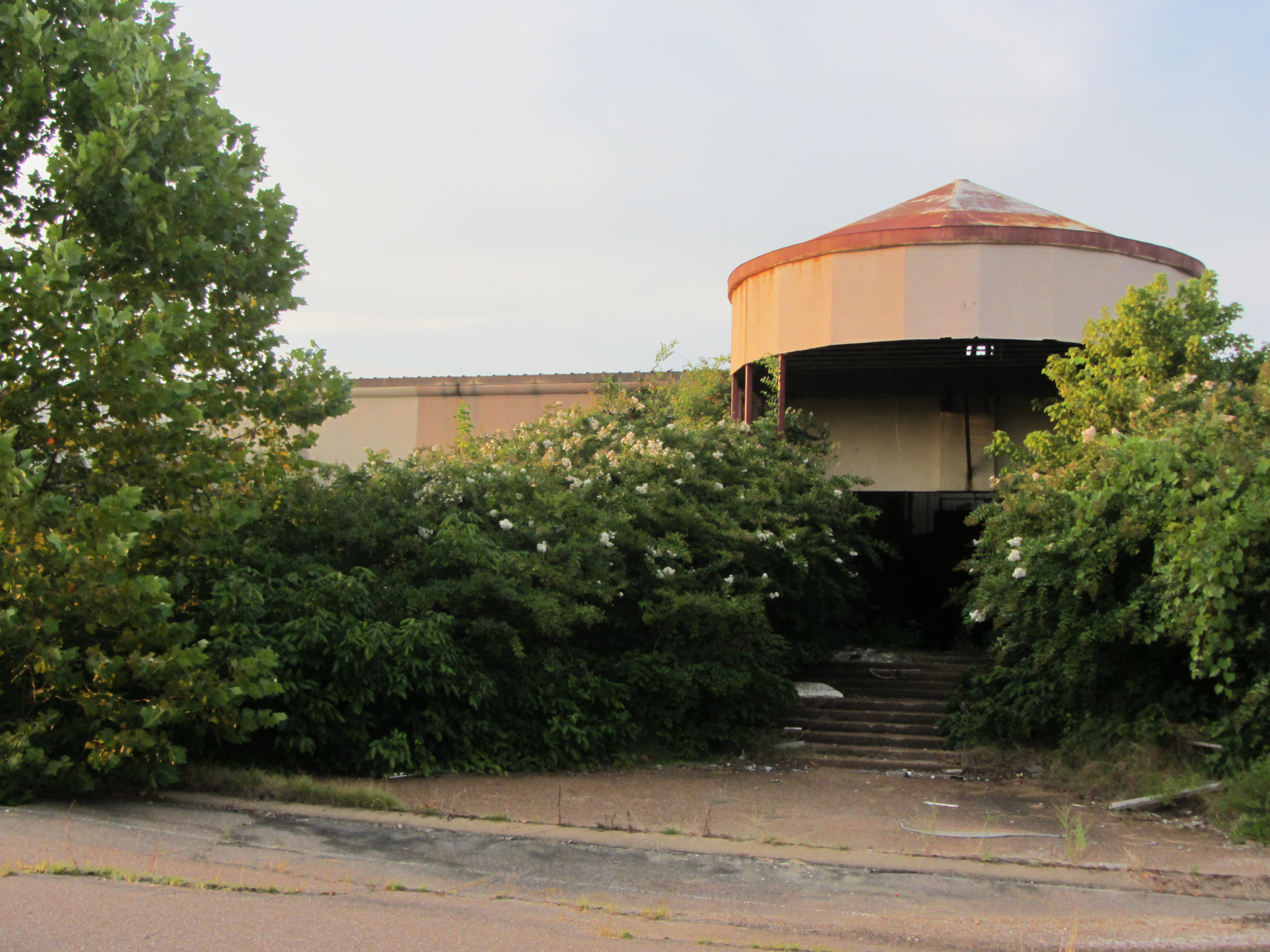
Splash casino, 2013
