= MV Iyanough =

High speed ferry in Massachusetts

History
- Namesake: Iyannough
- Owner: Steamship Authority
- Route: Hyannis–Nantucket
- Builder: Gladding-Hearn Shipbuilding
- Cost: $9.7 million
- Christened: March 24, 2007
- Home port: Woods Hole, Massachusetts
- Identification: IMO number: 9375719; MMSI number: 367145870; Callsign: WDD4527
- Status: In service

General characteristics
- Length: 154 feet (47 m)
- Beam: 39 feet (12 m)
- Draft: 5.3 feet (1.6 m)
- Speed: 35 knots (40 mph)
- Capacity: 400 people, 24 bicycles

MV Iyanough is a high-speed ferry that operates for the Steamship Authority on a route between Hyannis and Nantucket, Massachusetts.

Iyanough was built by Gladding-Hearn Shipbuilding to an Incat Crowther design at a cost of $9.7 million and was delivered to the Authority in January 2007. She was christened and commissioned into service during a ceremony on Nantucket Island on March 24, 2007. Iyanough measures 154 feet (47 m) in length, with a beam of 39 feet (12 m), and draws 5.3 feet (1.6 m). She is powered by four MTU diesel engines, which give her a top speed of 38 knots (44 mph) when fully loaded. She has a passenger capacity of 393, with 350 indoor seats and 40 on the outer deck.

On the night of June 16, 2017, Iyanough crashed into a jetty in Hyannis harbor, injuring fifteen passengers.
