= MV Katama =

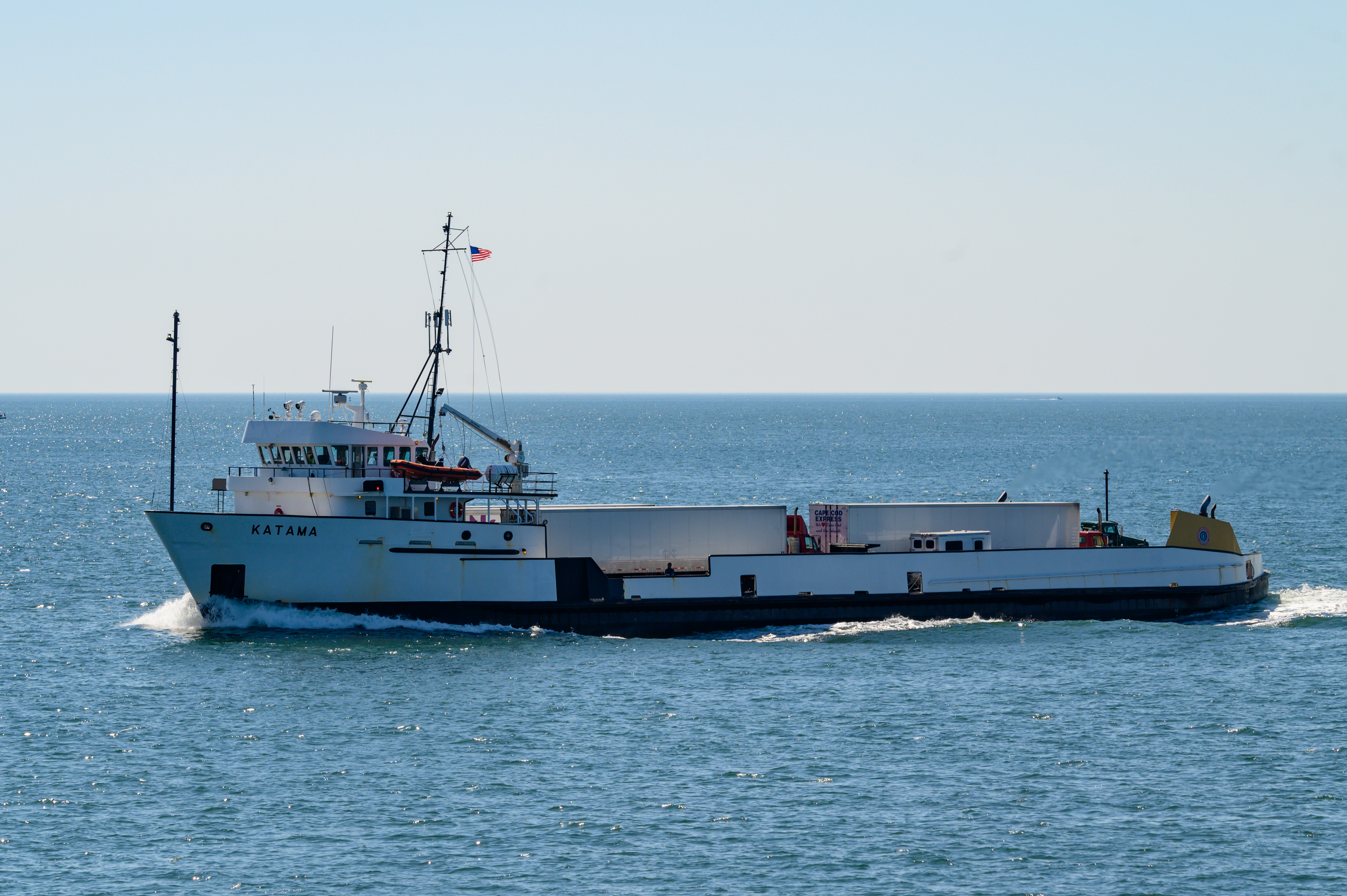
- Katama

History
- Namesake: Katama
- Owner: Steamship Authority
- Port of registry: (United States) Woods Hole, Ma
- Builder: Scully Bros Boat Builders, Morgan City, LA
- Yard number: 171
- Completed: 1982
- Acquired: 1986
- Identification: IMO number: 8213237; MMSI number: 367327330; Callsign: WBP4751
- Status: In service

General characteristics
- Tonnage: 120 DWT
- Length: 215.8 ft (65.8 m)
- Beam: 52 ft (16 m)
- Draft: 14.3 ft (4.4 m)
- Speed: 13.5 knots (25.0 km/h; 15.5 mph)
- Capacity: 150 persons, 39 vehicles

MV Katama is a freight ferry boat formerly operated by the Steamship Authority. The ship is named after the Katama region of Martha's Vineyard. The ship was built by Scully Bros Boat Builders at their Morgan City, Louisiana yard, completed in 1982, and initially named Pro Navigator before being acquired by the Steamship Authority in 1986. She is 215.8 feet (65.8 m) long, 52 feet (16 m) wide and has a speed of 13.5 knots (25.0 km/h). She was designed by Guarino & Cox as a platform supply vessel and is a sister ship to MV Gay Head.
