= Uncatena (steamboat) =

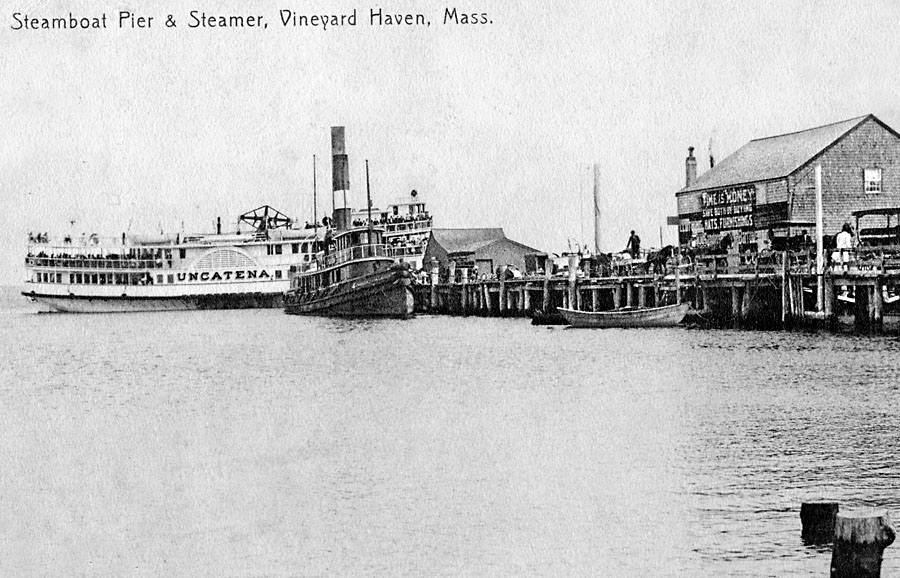
- Sidewheeler ferry Uncatena at Union Wharf in Vineyard Haven, MA before 1908.

History
- Namesake: Uncatena Island
- Operator: New Bedford, Martha's Vineyard, and Nantucket Steamboat Co.
- Launched: 1902
- Out of service: 1928

General characteristics
- Tonnage: 652 tons
- Length: 187 ft (57 m)
- Beam: 31 ft (9.4 m)
- Speed: 15 knots (28 km/h; 17 mph)

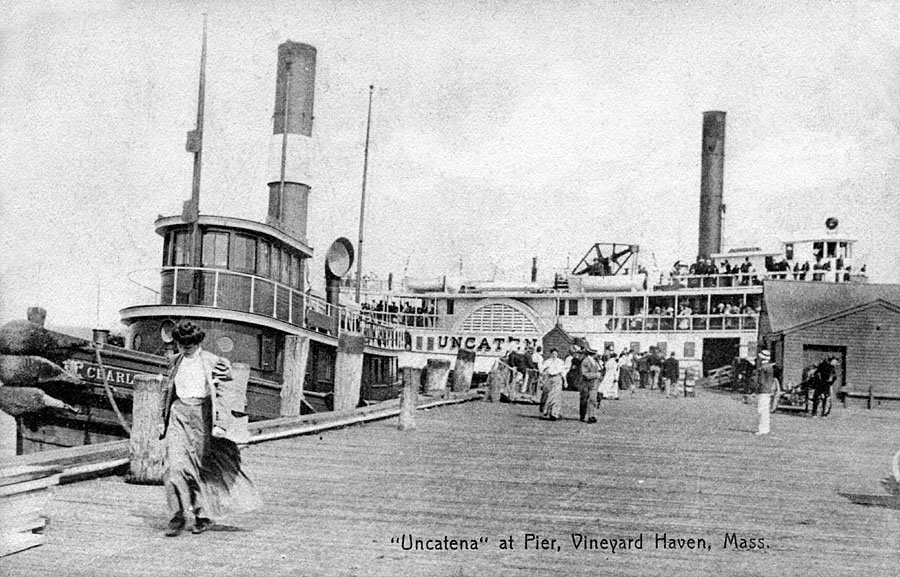
Sidewheeler ferry Uncatena at Union Wharf in Vineyard Haven, MA before 1915.

Uncatena was a sidewheel steamer operating as a ferry serving the island of Martha's Vineyard during the beginning of the twentieth century.

Uncatena was built in Wilmington, DE in 1902, and named after Uncatena Island, one of the Elizabeth Islands. She was 652 tons. She started service immediately to Martha's Vineyard for the New Bedford, Martha's Vineyard, and Nantucket Steamboat Co. Uncatena was the first steamer built with a steel hull to serve the island and the first with a propeller. The paddles were housed in the superstructure, and an outline of the paddlebox appeared on its sides.

The Vineyard Gazette wrote in June 1961:

The Uncatena, built in 1902, was 187 feet long, and had a 31-foot beam. An innovation in her construction was the placing of her shaft low enough so that passengers, boarding the boat by way of the freight deck as was often necessary, walked over it on an incline. On the older boats they had to duck their heads and pass under the shaft. She had a guaranteed speed of 15 miles an hour, and she often showed her heels to other boats of the line. The Uncatena was the only sidewheeler of the Island line to have a poem, written to her and about her by the Pulitzer Prize poet, Robert Hillyer, in 1948. The title of this nostalgic poem was In Memoriam Sidewheeler Uncatena, and it was aboard the Uncatena that Mr. Hillyer, lifelong lover of the Island, first came to the Vineyard in the early years of this century.

Capt. Marshall (evidently Francis J. Marshall (1857–1933) of Edgartown) and Capt. Sylvia were both masters of Uncatena.

Uncatena was retired from service in 1928, after 26 years of operation.
