= SS Nantucket (1956) =

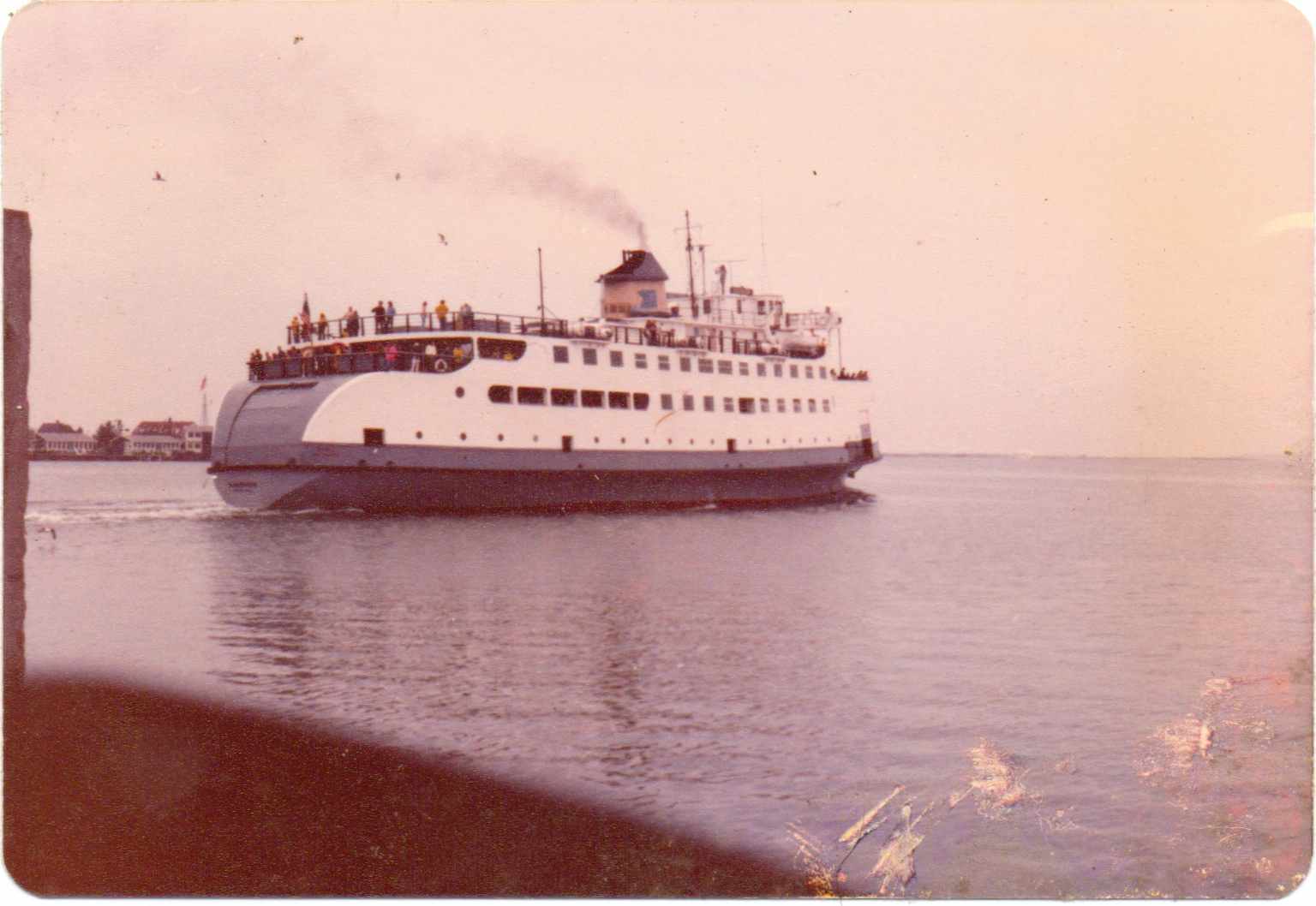
- SS Naushon underway in Nantucket Harbor, September 1979.

History
- Name: SS Nantucket
- Operator: The Woods Hole, Martha's Vineyard and Nantucket Steamship Authority
- Builder: John H. Mathis & Company
- Launched: 23 March 1956
- In service: 1957
- Out of service: 1987
- Identification: IMO number: 5246996
- Fate: Land-locked, then in 2012 was dismantled at Mhoon Landing in Tunica, Mississippi

General characteristics
- Tonnage: 2,652 GT
- Length: 213 ft (65 m)
- Installed power: Steam reciprocating

The SS Nantucket (renamed SS Naushon) was the last steam-powered ferry in regular operation on the East Coast of the United States. She was owned and operated by the Woods Hole, Martha's Vineyard and Nantucket Steamship Authority between 1957 and 1987.

== Details ==
Nantucket was originally designed with loading doors in the extreme bow and stern, so that cars and trucks could drive on at one end of the freight deck and off at the other. The bow doors proved unusable, however, and were welded shut early in the vessel's operational career. Thereafter, cars and trucks were loaded through the stern door, or through a door cut into the starboard (right) side of the vessel just behind the bow. Both methods complicated and slowed the loading process, and required Nantucket to always back into its slip. The vessel was thus more difficult to keep on schedule than subsequent ferries, which allowed vehicles to drive straight on and straight off.

The ship was described by Joseph Chase Allen as having "an impressive absence of beauty."

Nantucket had three decks above the freight deck, which were used for passenger accommodations. The Mezzanine Deck contained baggage-storage rooms and staterooms that passengers could book (at additional cost) in order to enjoy a greater degree of comfort and seclusion. Nantucket entered service as the Steamship Authority re-established service to New Bedford, and the staterooms were designed to appeal, particularly, to passengers on multi-hour trips from New Bedford to Nantucket. Never popular with passengers, the staterooms fell into disuse when service to New Bedford was discontinued. The Main Deck contained interior passenger seating (including large semi-circular booths upholstered in artificial red leather) and the snack bar. It also included open-air seating areas forward and aft of the vessel's superstructure. The Upper Deck, reached by an interior stairwell behind the pilothouse or by exterior stairs from the open, forward part of the Main Deck, consisted entirely of open-air seating. The vessel's lifeboats were also located on the Upper Deck.

Nantucket was renamed the SS Naushon in 1974, the year her original name was re-assigned to a new, state-of-the-art diesel-powered ferry which is still in use today. The steamer remained Naushon—a name held previously by two other Steamship Authority vessels, one in service from 1846 to 1848 and the other from 1929 until 1942—for its last 14 years of line service.

== Incidents ==
- During an emergency stop in Vineyard Haven Harbor on April 5, 1980, Naushon's anchor broke multiple undersea power cables for the island of Martha's Vineyard. Naushon had experienced a boiler feed-pump failure and had lost power while traveling from Nantucket to Woods Hole. In order to avoid drifting while repairs were made, the anchor was dropped. Owing to a combination of factors, including a rock that had jammed the anchor, strong currents, and the extra drag being exerted by a coast guard vessel which had moored to Naushon, the anchor did not hold. After digging a trench across the seafloor for about 700 feet (210 m), the anchor apparently snagged the undersea cables. Once repairs were completed, Naushon prepared to resume its journey. At the exact moment the anchor was weighed, power ceased flowing through the cables. The cables were later discovered to have snapped.
- On August 10, 1981, while approaching Woods Hole in heavy fog, Naushon experienced a bow to bow collision with the 156-foot (48 m) truck ferry Auriga. Auriga, which was departing Wood's Hole, was carrying sixteen passengers and several vehicles, while Naushon was carrying 350 passengers plus vehicles. Sixteen people were injured in the incident, which occurred more than a mile offshore.

== Casino years ==
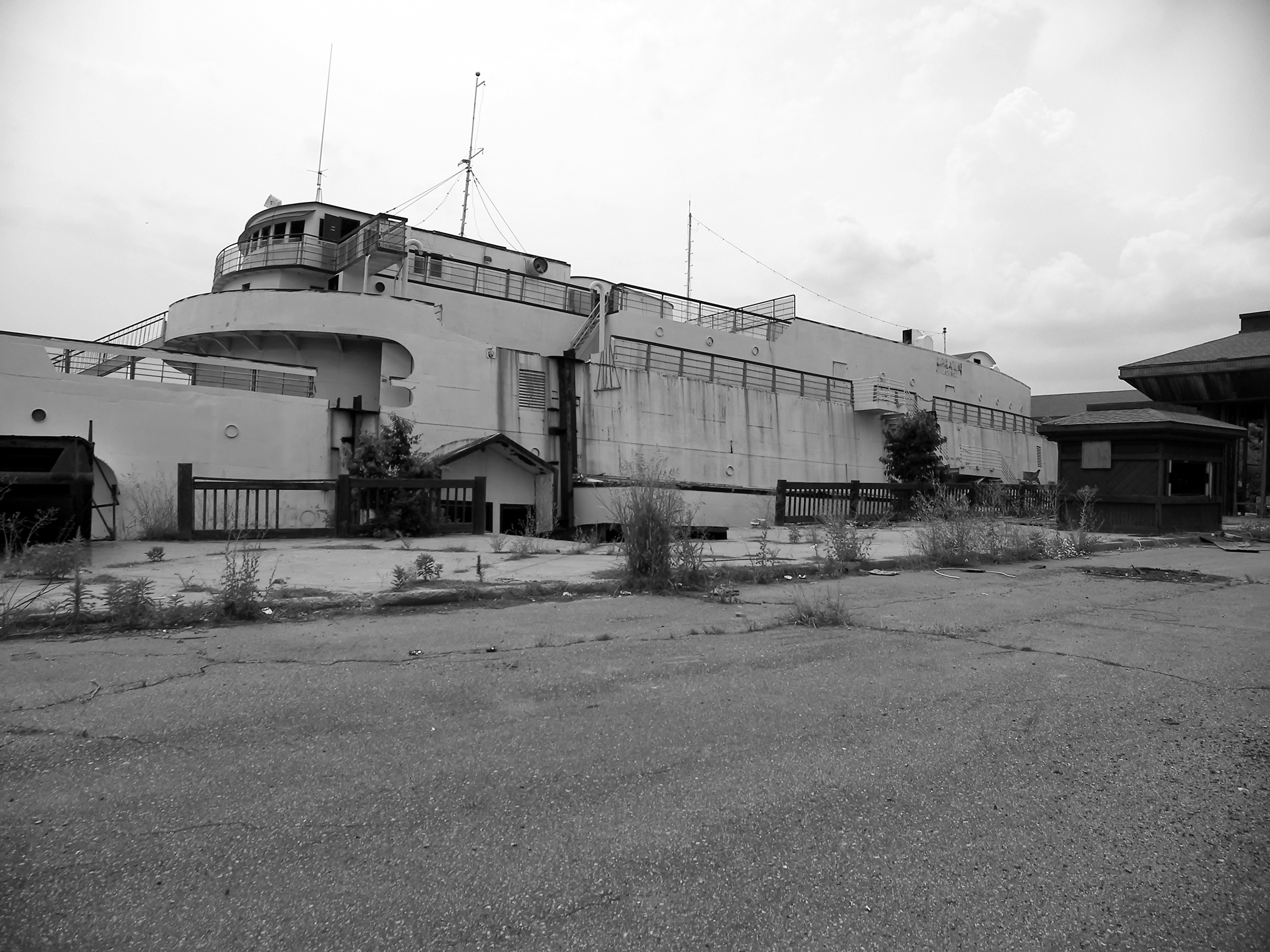
The former SS Nantucket languishing at Mhoon Landing in 2007

After its ferry service with the Steamship Authority ended, Naushon became a gaming vessel. She served from December 1993 to October 1995 as Cotton Club riverboat casino docked in Greenville, Mississippi.

Cotton Club did not stay in Greenville for long. In October 1995, the vessel and its supporting infrastructure were acquired by Alpha Hospitality. Alpha replaced Cotton Club with Jubilee, a larger casino vessel from their less successful Lakeshore, Mississippi site at Bayou Caddy. Meanwhile, Cotton Club was moved to Bayou Caddy, renovated to have a "Roaring Twenties theme", and renamed Bayou Caddy's Jubilation. Alpha hoped that the smaller vessel would reduce operating costs at the Bayou Caddy site. However, Bayou Caddy's Jubilation was ultimately unsuccessful. After being open from December 1995 until July 1996, it was shut down by the Mississippi Gaming Commission due to insufficient working capital. Alpha actually had planned to close it down themselves in one more month, as the Lakeshore site had been operating at a loss for some years.

After lying dormant for several years, the vessel began a process which would lead to its final relocation. In July 1999, Bayou Caddy's Jubilation was transferred to Casino Ventures. Casino Ventures planned to refurbish it for use as the Splash Back casino at Mhoon Landing in Tunica, Mississippi. Alpha received $150,000 in cash, a $1,350,000 promissory note and a 15% membership interest in Casino Ventures for the transaction, but cautioned its shareholders that "Alpha cannot provide any assurance that Casino Ventures will succeed." As Gaming Today observed, "One thing is for sure. They will have plenty of parking space. At one time four casino vessels occupied property at Mhoon Landing," but "they moved away as it became obvious that locations closer to Memphis were preferred by both customers and employees."

Nevertheless, the vessel was moved to a man-made pond at Mhoon Landing, a process hindered by low water levels in the Mississippi River. Although Casino Ventures had originally planned to open the vessel within four months of securing financing, they were still seeking additional financing by 2003. That April the Mississippi Gaming Commission announced site approval for the project was expiring. The casino was then dismantled in 2012.

== Trivia ==
- Naushon appears in the 1975 movie Jaws. Footage of the Naushon and the Islander entering Tisbury, MA is used to portray countless boatloads of unsuspecting beachgoers flooding onto "Amity Island". The footage occurs about 45 minutes into the movie.

== Gallery ==
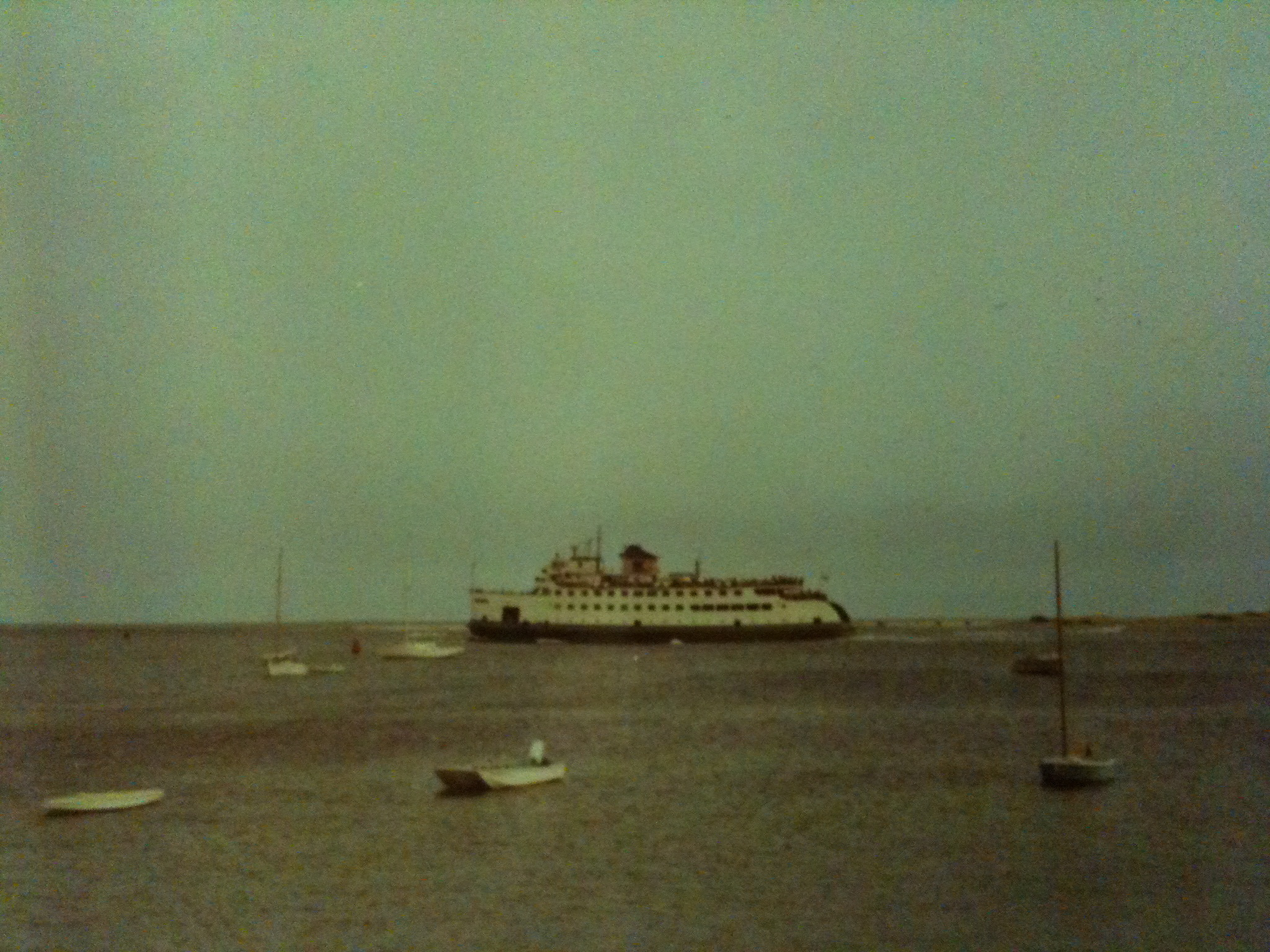
Naushon leaving Nantucket harbor, August/September 1971.

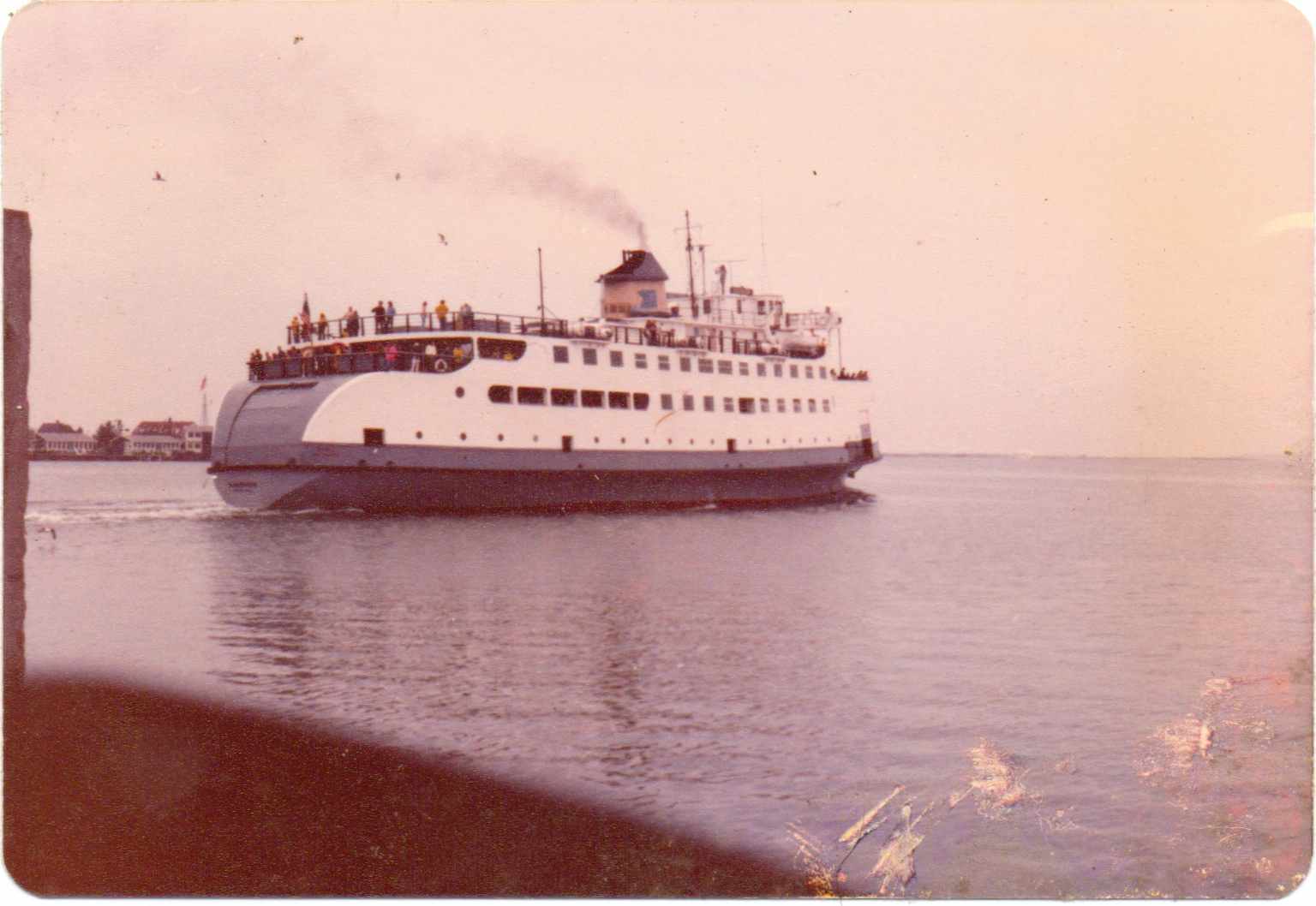
Naushon underway in Nantucket Harbor, September 1979.

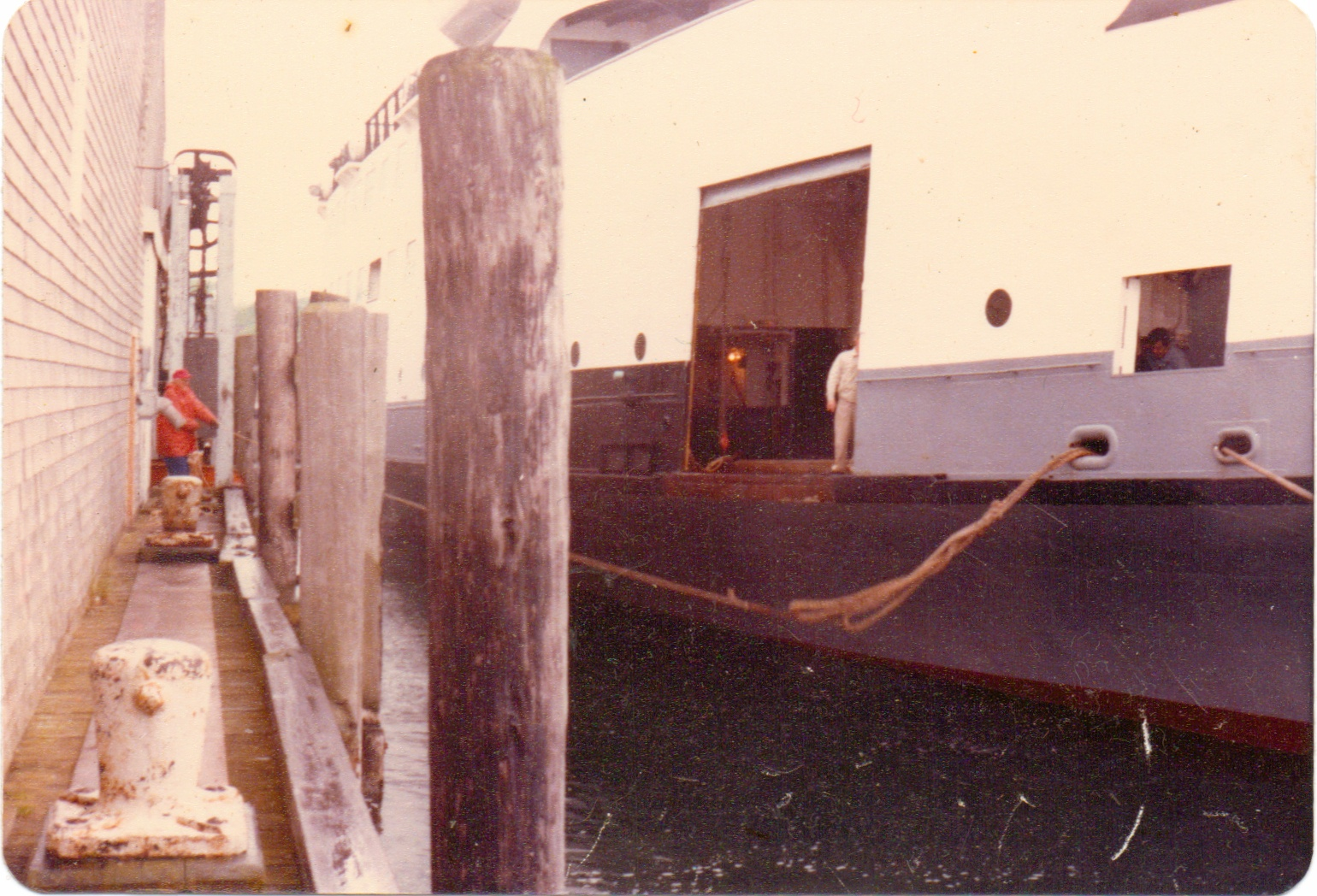
Naushon warping in, September 1979.

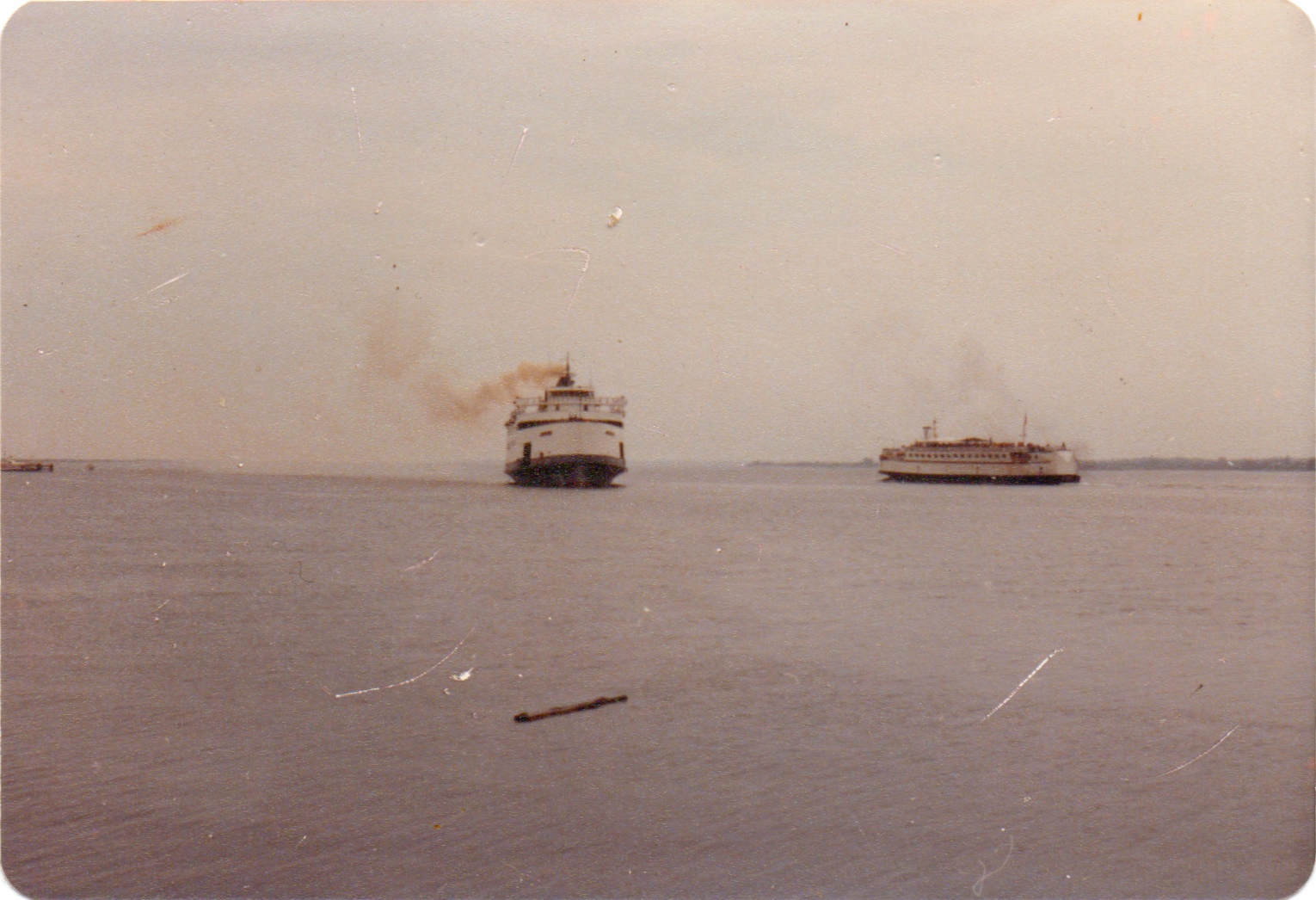
The SS Naushon passing the MV Uncatena in Nantucket harbor, September 1979.

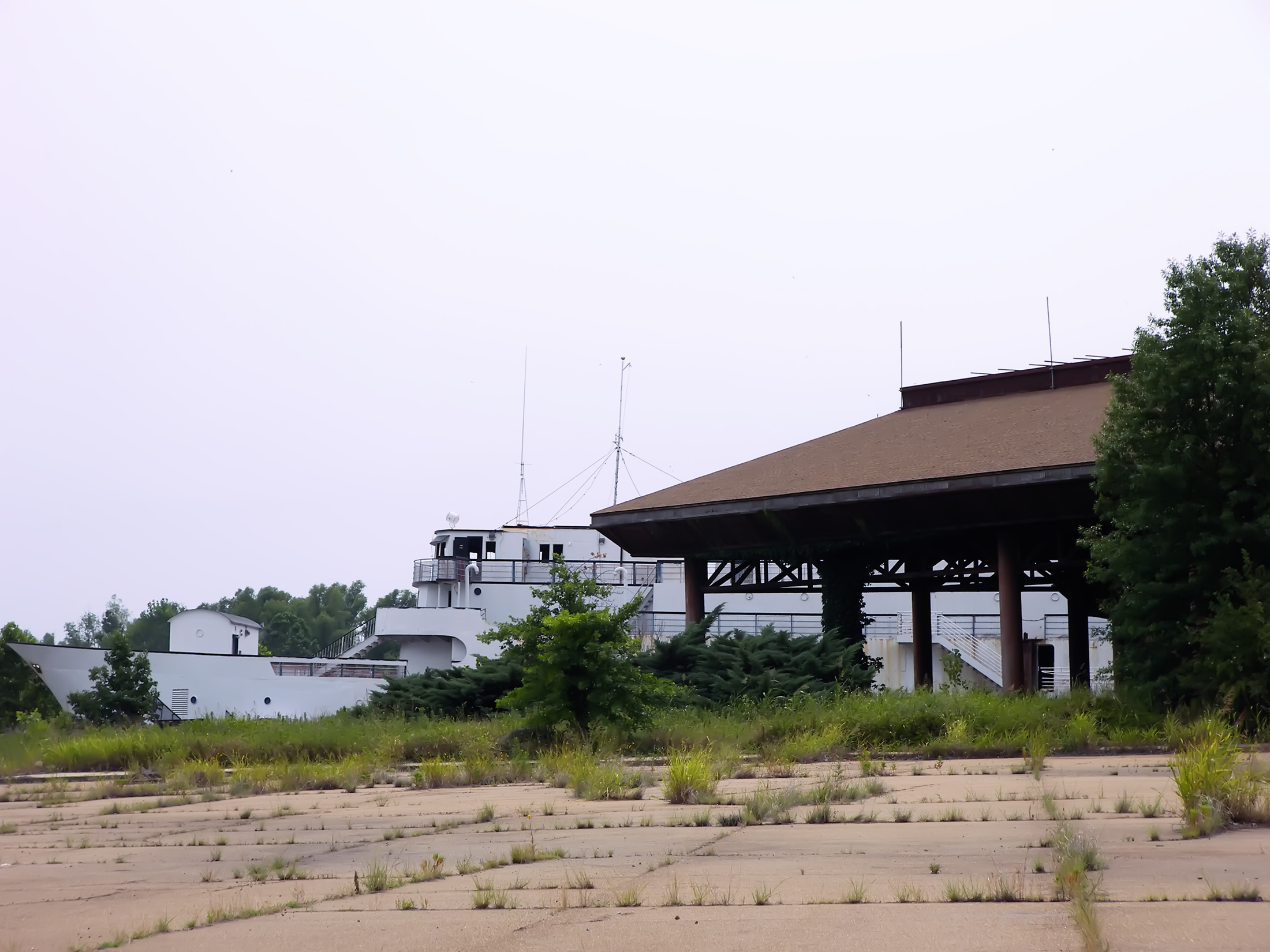
"Splash Back" at Mhoon Landing, June 2007

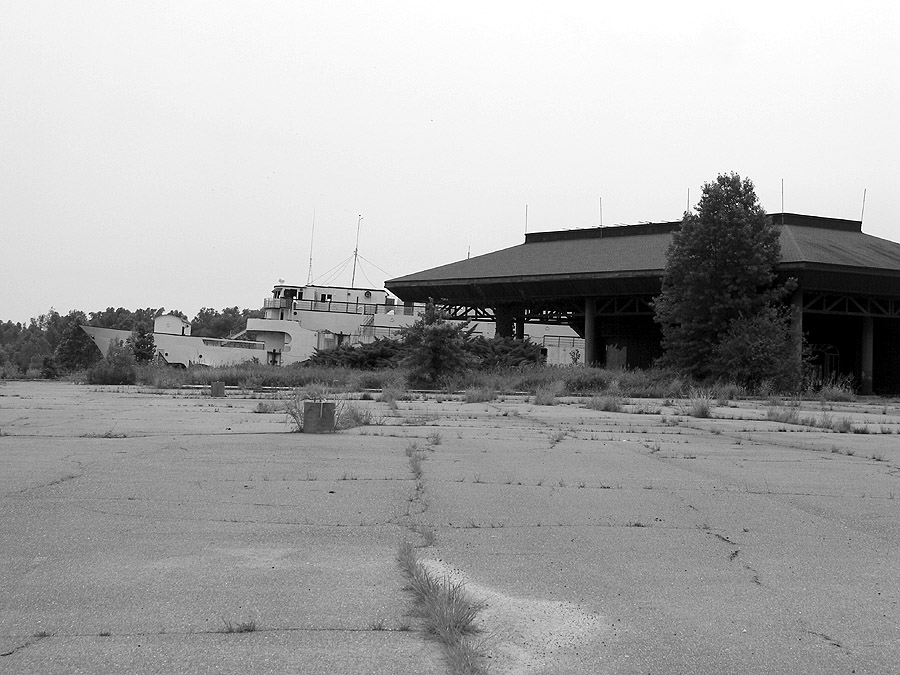
"Splash Back" at Mhoon Landing, June 2007
