= MV Uncatena =

MV Uncatena was a passenger and vehicle ferry that was operated by the Steamship Authority, and later by several Florida-based entrepreneurs that attempted to convert her to a gambling boat.

Uncatena was built by Blount Boats in Warren, Rhode Island, and was launched on June 27, 1965. She began service to Nantucket island on July 29. In 1971, she was lengthened by 52 feet (16 m) by adding a section amidships. In 1993, she left Authority line service and was sold to Casino Miami Cruises, which renamed her Entertainer and modified her to operate gambling cruises out of Miami beginning in 1997. This endeavor proved unprofitable, and she was moved to Tampa and renovated again to run gambling cruises in the area; however, Hurricane Ivan in 2004 and the development of on shore casinos meant that she was scrapped in 2008.
