= MV Nantucket =

Ship built in 1974

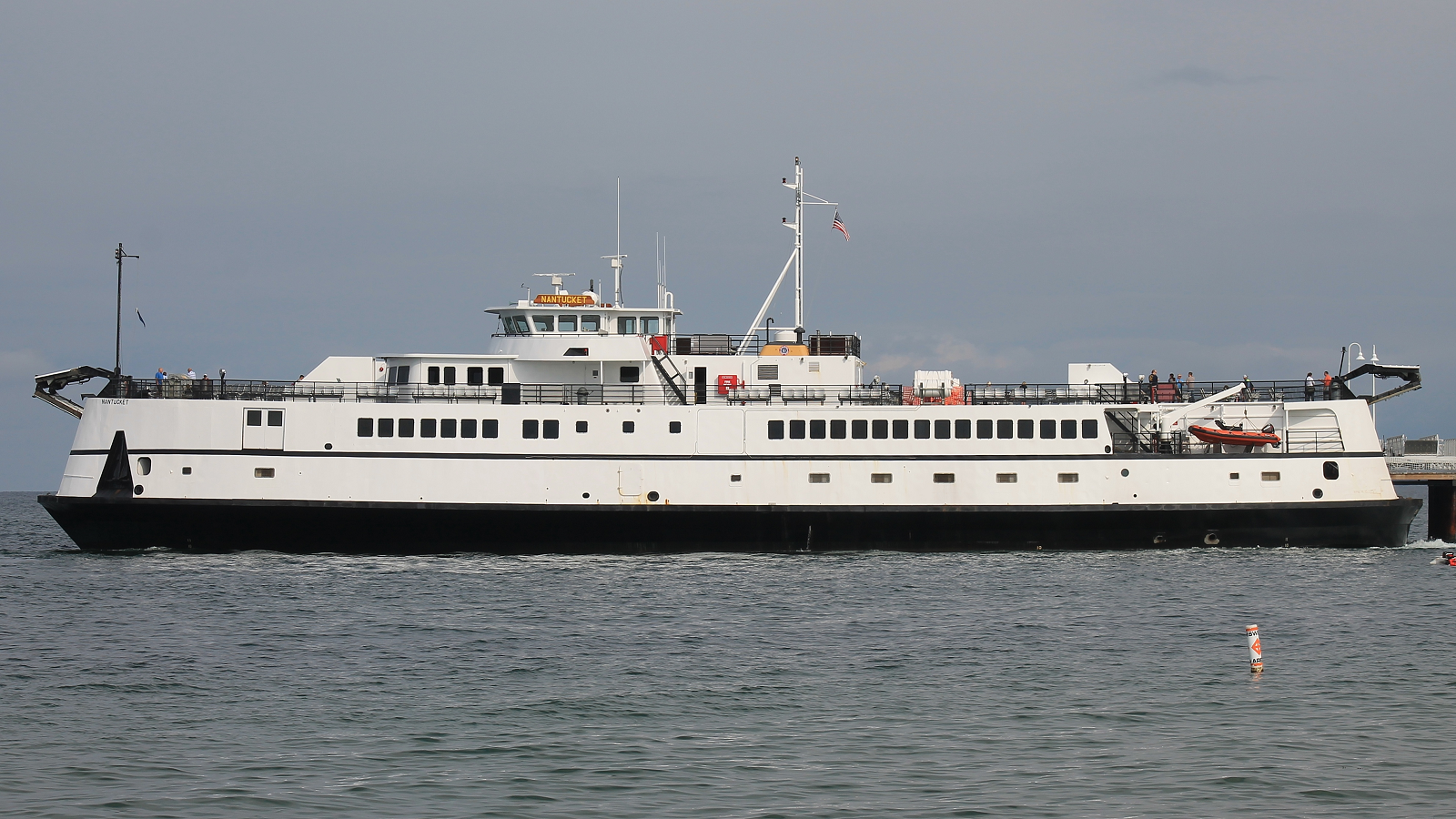
- Nantucket docking at Oak Bluffs, August 2017.

History
- Namesake: Nantucket
- Owner: Steamship Authority
- Builder: Belinger Shipyards
- Completed: 1974
- Identification: IMO number: 7334199; MMSI number: 367324580; Callsign: WBQ6814
- Status: In service

General characteristics
- Length: 216.6 ft (66.0 m)
- Beam: 60.3 ft (18.4 m)
- Draft: 17 ft (5.2 m)
- Speed: 14 knots (26 km/h; 16 mph)

MV Nantucket is a 230-foot-long (70 m) ferry owned and operated by the Steamship Authority. It was built in 1974 by Belinger Shipyards in Jacksonville, Florida. She serves the islands of Nantucket and Martha's Vineyard. She was named after a 19th-century paddlewheel steamer serving this route, the sidewheeler Nantucket.
