= Iyannough =

American Indian sachem and leader of the Mattachiest

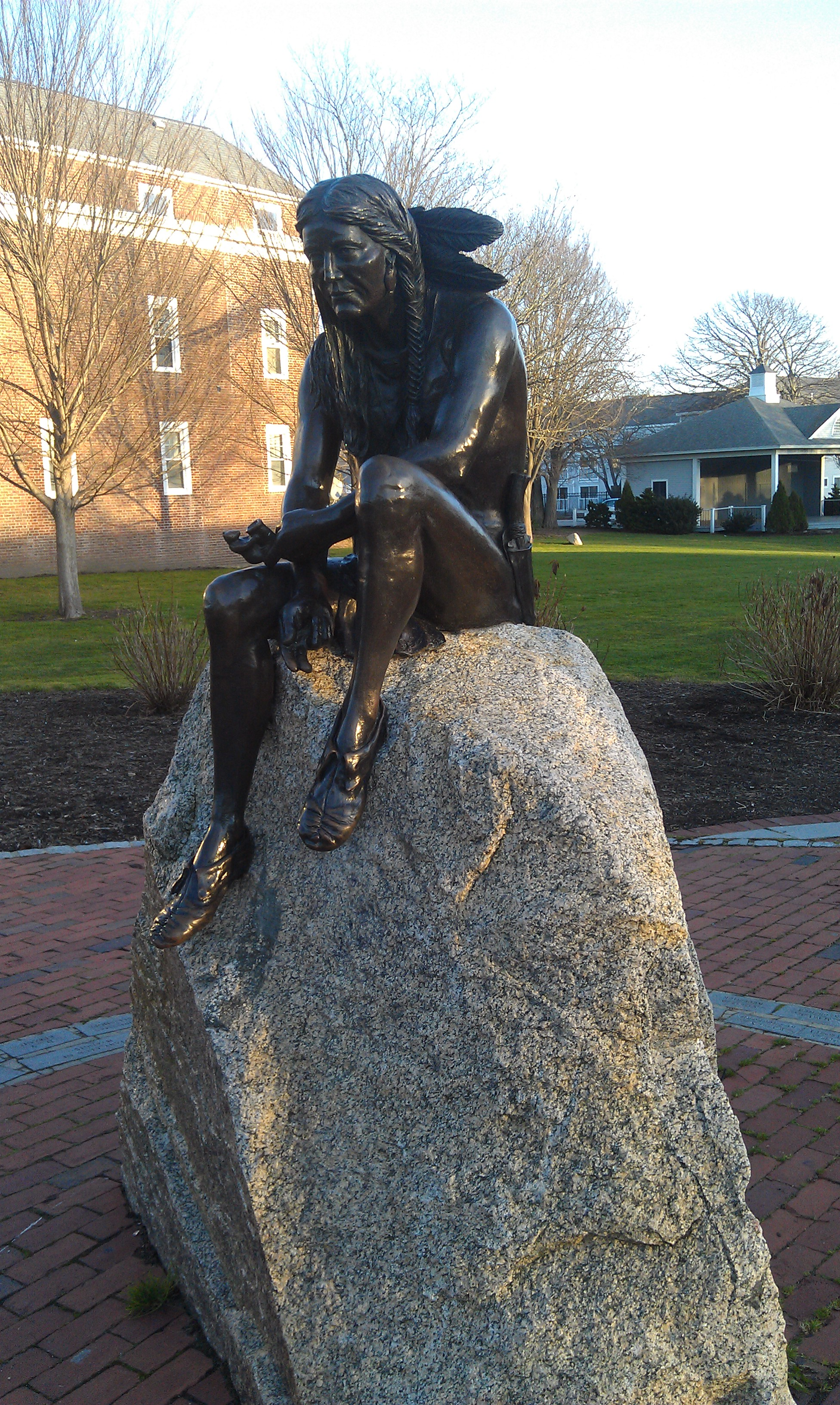
Statue of Iyannough in Hyannis

Iyannough (also Iyanough) was an American Indian sachem and leader of the Mattachiest (Mattakeese, a sub-group of the Wampanoag people) tribe of Cummaquid in the area of what is now Barnstable, Massachusetts. The village of Hyannis, the Wianno section of Osterville, and Iyannough Road (Route 132) are all named after him.

== Life ==
Historic records mention the assistance and entertainment offered by him and his tribe towards the Pilgrims and later colonists. When the son of Mayflower passenger John Billington wandered away from the new settlement at Plymouth in January 1621, Iyannough assisted in finding the boy. A party of ten Pilgrims, including Edward Winslow (who is generally thought to be the author of the events) and two American Indians, the interpreter Tisquantum and "special friend" Tokamahamon, met Mattakeese tribesmen, and were invited to eat with them.

They brought us to their sachem, or governour: whom they called Iyannough, a man not exceeding twenty-six years of age, but very personable, gentle, courteous, and fair conditioned, indeed not like a savage, save for his attire. His entertainment was answerable to his parts, and his cheer plentiful and various.

It is believed that he died c. 1623, in his late twenties. Relations between the Indians and Pilgrims began to deteriorate, and after a surprise attack by Myles Standish on the Massachusett tribe that winter, many Indians in the region grew fearful of the colonists and fled to hide in the area's swamps and remote islands. It is believed that Iyannough himself died of exposure during this time. Upon his early death, his lands went to his eldest son Yanno, also known as John Hyanno.

== Legacy ==
Yanno is mentioned in several land deeds on Cape Cod and Martha's Vineyard and appears to have been a prominent figure in the early settlement of the communities.

In 1861, David Davis and Patrick Hughs overturned a brass kettle while plowing a field in the Cummaquid neighborhood of Barnstable. Underneath this kettle, they found a skeleton in a seated position. "The kettle covered the skull; a stone pestle lay beside the right arm; the decayed remains of a bow and arrow rested beside the left arm; and near the feet were a [iron] hatchet, an earthen dish, and pieces of black and white wampum."

In 1894, the Cape Cod Historical Society marked the site of the grave in Cummaquid with a slate tablet. The inscription refers to the sachem's kindness to the Pilgrims at the time they were trying to locate the young boy who was lost:

On this spot was buried the

SACHEM IYANNOUGH

The friend and entertainer

of the Pilgrims, June, 1621

Erected by the Cape Cod Historical Society

While the remains discovered in 1861 were thought to be those of sachem Iyannough, an examination of the skeleton by the curator and staff of Pilgrim Hall Museum concluded that they were actually the remains of a young woman. According to the document prepared by the Department of Interior the skeleton and most of the associated funerary objects were repatriated to Frank James of the Wampanoag Tribe. On August 12, 1964, these remains and artifacts were reinterred in a private burial spot near the original gravesite.

A statue of Iyannough can be found on the Hyannis village green.

== See also ==
- Hyannis
- Nauset
