= Nantucket (steamboat) =

Sidewheel steamer

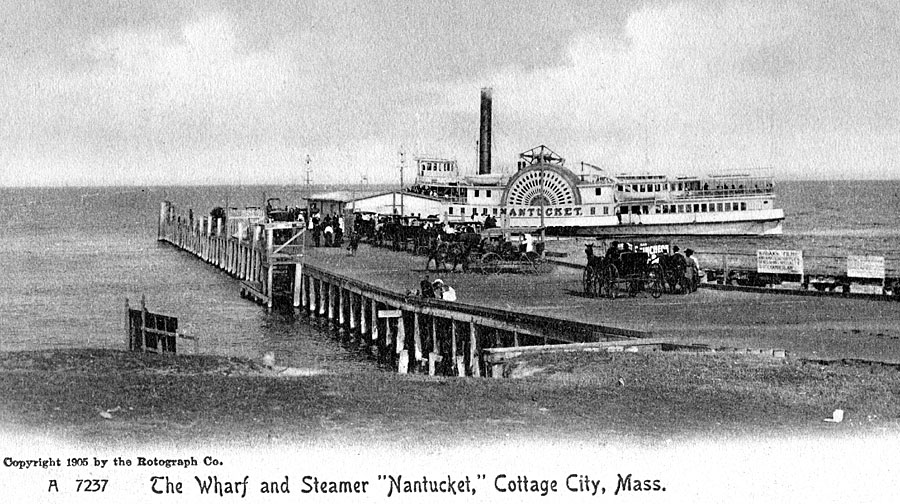
Sidewheeler ferry Nantucket at the wharf in Oak Bluffs, Massachusetts in a 1905 postcard image.

Steamer Nantucket circa 1897.

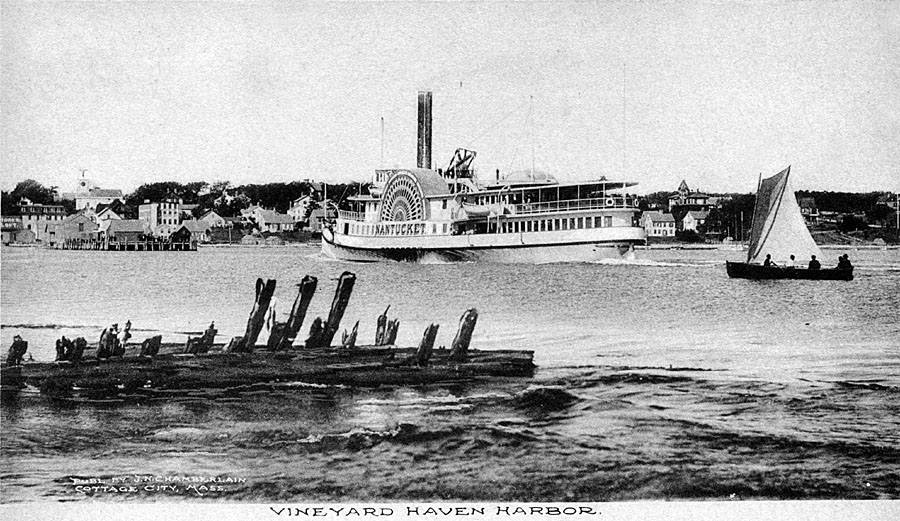
Sidewheeler ferry Nantucket in Vineyard Haven harbor in a pre-1907 postcard image.

The Nantucket was a sidewheel steamer operating as a ferry serving the islands of Martha's Vineyard and Nantucket during the end of the nineteenth century and the beginning of the twentieth century. On the Vineyard it docked at Cottage City (later Oak Bluffs, Massachusetts), Vineyard Haven, and the West Chop Wharf.

The Nantucket, a 629-ton vessel, was built in 1886 in Wilmington, Delaware for service with the New Bedford, Martha's Vineyard, and Nantucket Steamboat Co. fleet, later reorganized as the Steamship Authority.

According to a 1961 Vineyard Gazette article, the Nantucket "had decorated paddleboxes that made large, rhythmic and beautiful half-circles on the sides."

Nantucket measured 190 feet long with a beam of 33 feet. It was copper fastened, and its double frame made of oak, hackmatack and cedar. Its hull had three watertight bulkheads, and drew four-and-a-half feet of water.

A new ferry, the MV Nantucket, was built in 1974 and named after this old sidewheeler.
