= Monohansett (steamboat) =

Ferry Sidewheel steamer operation

Coordinates: 42°32′45.65″N 70°47′48.12″W

the steamer Monohansett, possibly at West Chop Wharf in Tisbury, Massachusetts.

The steamer Monohansett in Edgartown Harbor, 1896.

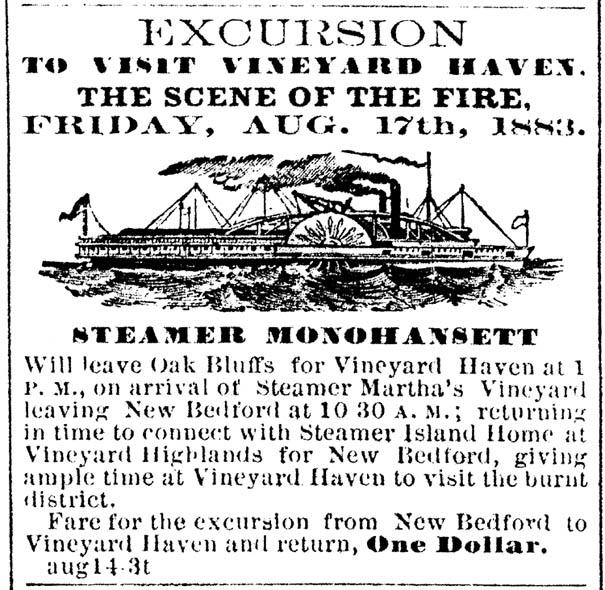
August 1883 advertisement in the Vineyard Gazette for excursions of the steamer Monohansett to tour the ruins of Vineyard Haven after the Great Fire of 1883 destroyed virtually the entire village.

Monohansett was a sidewheel steamer operating as a ferry serving the island of Martha's Vineyard during the late nineteenth century. She was named after Monohansett Island, a tiny 12-acre (4.9-hectare) island off Naushon Island.

== Construction ==
Monohansett was built in 1862 by the New Bedford, Martha's Vineyard, & Nantucket Steamboat Company as a replacement for the steamer Eagle's Wing, which had caught fire during a race on the Providence River off Pawtuxet in 1861 and was destroyed. The engine from Eagle's Wing was fitted into the new vessel. Monohansett was built in five months in the shipyard of Thomas Collier of New York under the supervision of Monohansett's designer Captain Benjamin C. Cromwell of Vineyard Haven, Massachusetts. She was 182 feet (55 m) long, with a beam of 28 feet (8.5 m), 9 feet 6 inches (2.90 m) depth, and had a gross register tonnage of 489. Her keel was made of white oak, her deck timbers were of oak and white chestnut, and her tops of hackmatack and white chestnut. Monohansett made her first trip to Martha's Vineyard, to the Edgartown wharf, on June 1, 1862.

== Civil War service ==
Barely two months later, on August 13, 1862, the United States Government chartered Monohansett. During the American Civil War, Monohansett carried dispatches to United States Navy ships operating in the Atlantic Ocean off Cape Hatteras and Wilmington, North Carolina, as well as in the Chesapeake Bay and the Potomac River. The small screw steamer Helen Augusta operated as the substitute ferry to Martha's Vineyard during the war. By the end of the war in April 1865, Monohansett was the headquarters boat at City Point, Virginia, and was used by General Ulysses S. Grant as a dispatch boat. General Grant reportedly was very fond of Monohansett, and President Abraham Lincoln and his wife also spent time aboard her.

== Vineyard ferry service ==
Monohansett returned to service as a Martha's Vineyard ferry in June 1865. In the summer of 1874, now-President Grant used the Monohansett to visit Martha's Vineyard, arriving in Cottage City (now Oak Bluffs).

Monohansett was first commanded by Captain Benjamin C. Cromwell, her designer, and during the American Civil War by Hiram Crowell. Captain Charles C. Smith (b. 1826), who served as first mate under Captain Crowell during war duty, became captain of Monohansett in 1867 and was still master in 1885.

Although Monohansett was primarily a Vineyard boat, she occasionally would make trips to Nantucket, especially during wintertime "freeze-ups," when Monohansett would force her way through the ice to relieve the isolated Nantucket residents.

== Final years ==
Monohansett was sold in 1901 or 1903 (sources vary), and was used around Boston, Massachusetts, and the Massachusetts North Shore. On 3 August 1904, she was wrecked in a dense fog on Little Misery Island in the Misery Islands in Salem Harbor, Massachusetts, while headed to Boston from Gloucester, Massachusetts.
