= Francis Apthorp Foster =

American historian (1872–1966)

- Born: September 21, 1872; Cambridge, Massachusetts, U.S.
- Died: March 18, 1966 (aged 93)
- Resting place: Mount Auburn Cemetery, Cambridge, Massachusetts, U.S.
- Education: Harvard University
- Occupations: Historian, ornithologist

Francis Apthorp Foster (September 21, 1872 – March 18, 1966) was an American historian and ornithologist.

== Life and career ==
Foster was born in 1872 in Cambridge, Massachusetts, to Francis Charles "Frank" Foster and Marion Padelford. He was the youngest of their three known children, born after Leonard and Caroline. He attended Brown and Nichols School in Cambridge and graduated from Lawrence Scientific School at Harvard University.

In 1898, Foster was on the membership committee of the Society of Colonial Wars in the Commonwealth of Massachusetts.

In 1900, he was a member of the Union Club of Boston.

He was listed as a resident member of the Bunker Hill Monument Association in 1910.

In 1911, Foster wrote, in conjunction with the Colonial Society of Massachusetts, Burning of Harvard Hall, 1764, and its Consequences, which was published by J. Wilson and Son, University Press. Foster was on the society's Committee of Publication.

In 1923, in partnership with the Society of the Cincinnati, Foster wrote The Institution of the Society of the Cincinnati: Together with Standing Resolutions, Ordinances, Rules and Precedents of the General Society. Foster had been elected to the society's Standing Executive Committee in 1911, as a respresentative of Georgia.

Foster was also a member of the American Historic Association.

== Personal life ==
Foster's uncle, through his mother, was Edward Padelford, who was a prominent merchant in Savannah, Georgia, where Foster's parents were married in 1857.

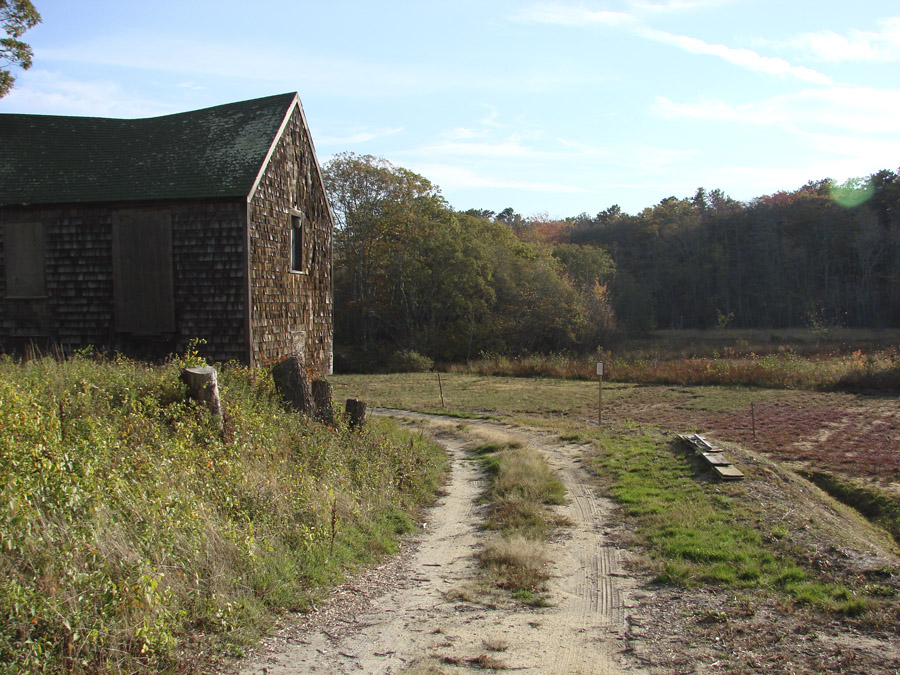
An old cranberry bog in Lambert's Cove

In the late 19th century, Foster was living at 15 Oxford Street in Cambridge, Massachusetts, a home his parents had purchased in the early 1860s.

For several years, Foster lived alone at what is now Lambert's Cove Inn at Lambert's Cove on Martha's Vineyard. Foster first visited the island in 1915, the year his father died, while a resident of Edgartown. In 1918, he began to purchase farmland around West Tisbury. He purchased the property from the Norton family, and moved to the property permanently around 1930. In 1927, he hoped to turn 600 acres (240 ha) into a bird sanctuary, but the island did not have the variety of birds needed for the Audubon Society to support the venture, even though 116 different species had been seen on the land.

In 1922, he wrote a memoir of Henry Ernest Woods.

== Death ==
Foster died in 1966, aged 93. He was interred in Mount Auburn Cemetery in Cambridge, Massachusetts, alongside his parents and brother, the latter of whom predeceased him by 76 years, aged 31 or 32.
