= Lambert's Cove Beach =

In West Tisbury, Massachusetts, U.S.

Coordinates: 41°26′06.48″N 70°39′40.58″W

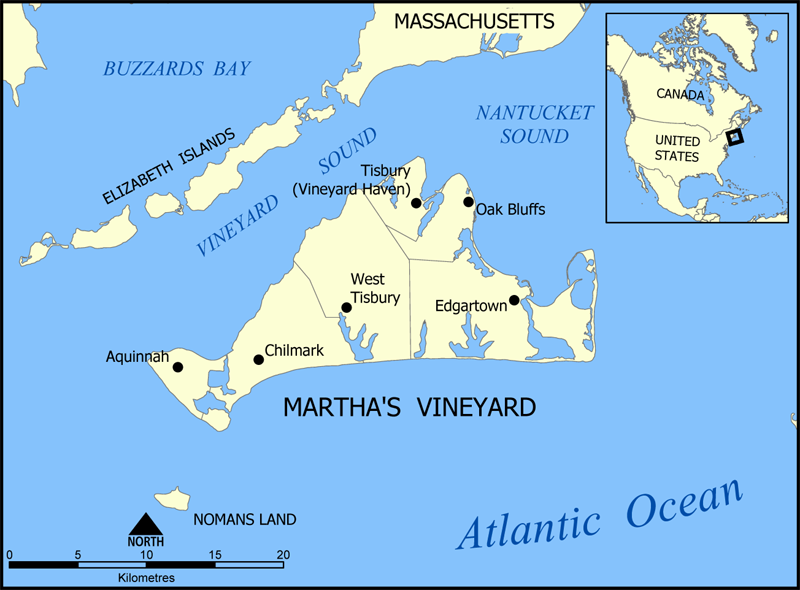
Martha's Vineyard

Lambert's Cove Beach is a well-known beach in the town of West Tisbury on the island of Martha's Vineyard in Massachusetts, United States. The beach is located off Lambert's Cove Road and is situated in a cove off of Vineyard Sound facing west towards the Elizabeth Islands. It is known chiefly for the beauty of the beach and the setting, which recalls a Caribbean cove.
