= Edward Padelford =

American merchant

- Born: Edward Nathaniel Packard Padelford; April 30, 1799; Taunton, Massachusetts, U.S.
- Died: June 27, 1870 (aged 71); Savannah, Georgia, U.S.
- Occupations: cotton trading, shipping lines

Edward Nathaniel Packard Padelford (April 30, 1799 – June 27, 1870) was an American businessman, prominent in Savannah, Georgia. He was one of the city's longest-serving merchants and most respected citizens, and was a board member of a large number of companies. At the time of his death, he was among the wealthiest of merchants in the American South.

He lost both his sons in the Civil War; one was a Confederate officer.

== Early life ==
Padelford was born in Taunton, Massachusetts, in 1799 to Dr. Philip Padelford and Elizabeth McComber. He was the youngest of their seven known children born between 1786 and 1799, although three of them (two Philips and Rodger) died before Edward was born.

== Career ==
Padelford moved to Savannah, Georgia, in April 1820, around the time of his 21st birthday. His contemporaries in the city included master builder Isaiah Davenport, Godfrey Barnsley (a British-born businessman and cotton broker), Stephen Elliott (first Bishop of Georgia), John W. Beckwith (second Bishop of Georgia), Michael Cash (stonemason), Charles B. Cluskey (architect), Hugh Comer (businessman and president of Central of Georgia Railroad), Charles Augustus Lafayette Lamar (businessman), Gazaway Bugg Lamar (cotton and shipping merchant), George Welshman Owens (lawyer), Willard Preston (educator), James C. Saltus (carpenter), James M. Simms (African-American minister), silversmith Moses Eastman, and James and Charlotte De Bernier Taylor (a merchant and entomologist couple).

Padelford established a shipping business with Orrey Taft under the name Taft & Padelford. This venture lasted for thirteen years, dissolving in January 1833. In November, he joined Samuel H. Fay and C. B. Carter to form a general commission business named Padelford & Fay Company. The retiring Fay's brother, Joseph, joined the ranks from 1838 to 1861, when the company ceased trading.

In 1833, Padelford joined a committee to petition for better mail service between Savannah, Macon and Augusta.

His long career in the banking sector began in February 1834, when he was elected a director of the Marine and Fire Insurance Bank. He later became its president and largest shareholder.

Padelford was elected a director of the Georgia Insurance and Trust Company in 1836.

He became a founding member of the Georgia Historical Society in 1839, and was later elected as a steward of the Jockey Club.

Padelford was elected one of Savannah's Commissioners of Pilotage in January 1831. That August, he was elected to the grand jury.

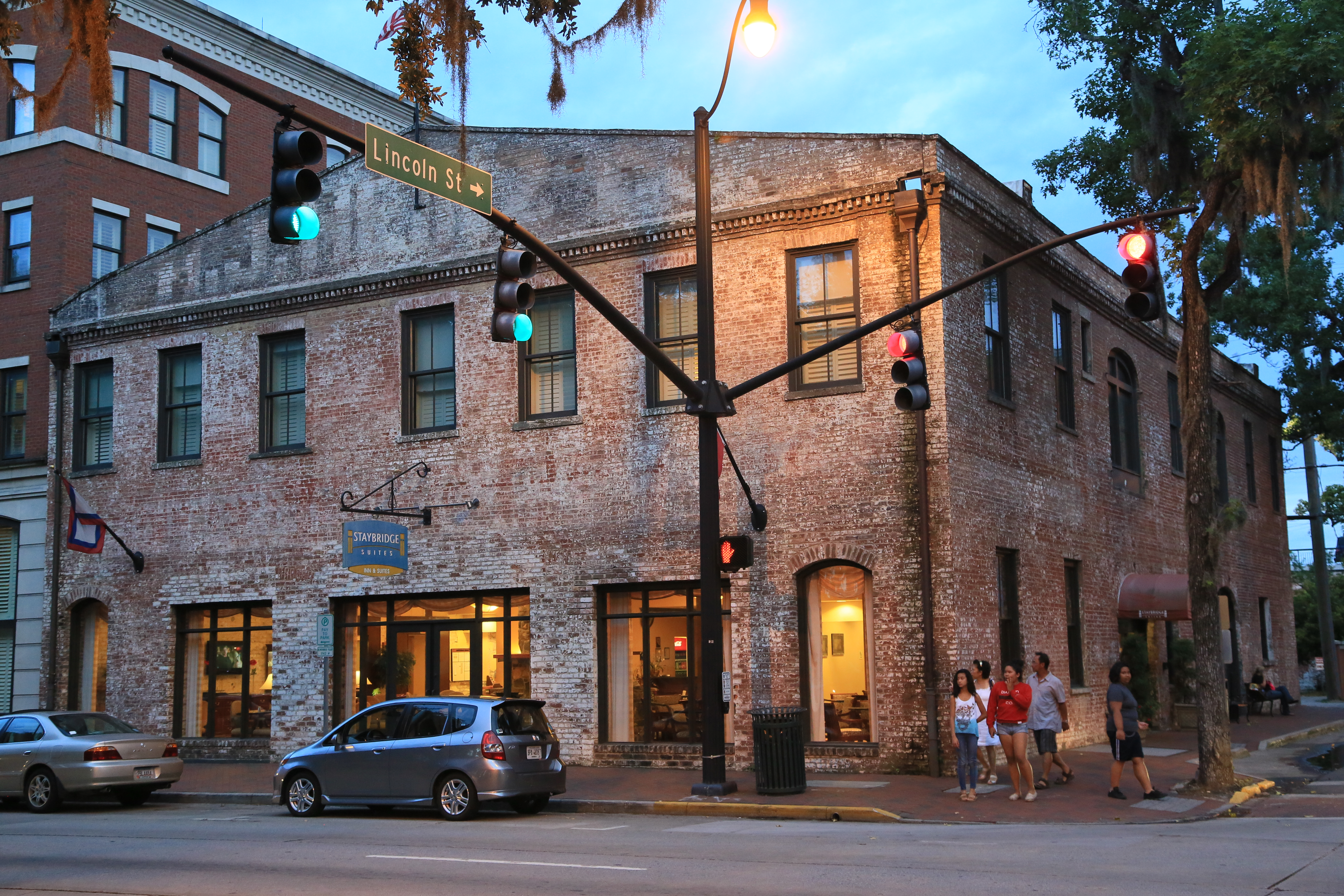
301 East Bay Street, built for Padelford in 1851

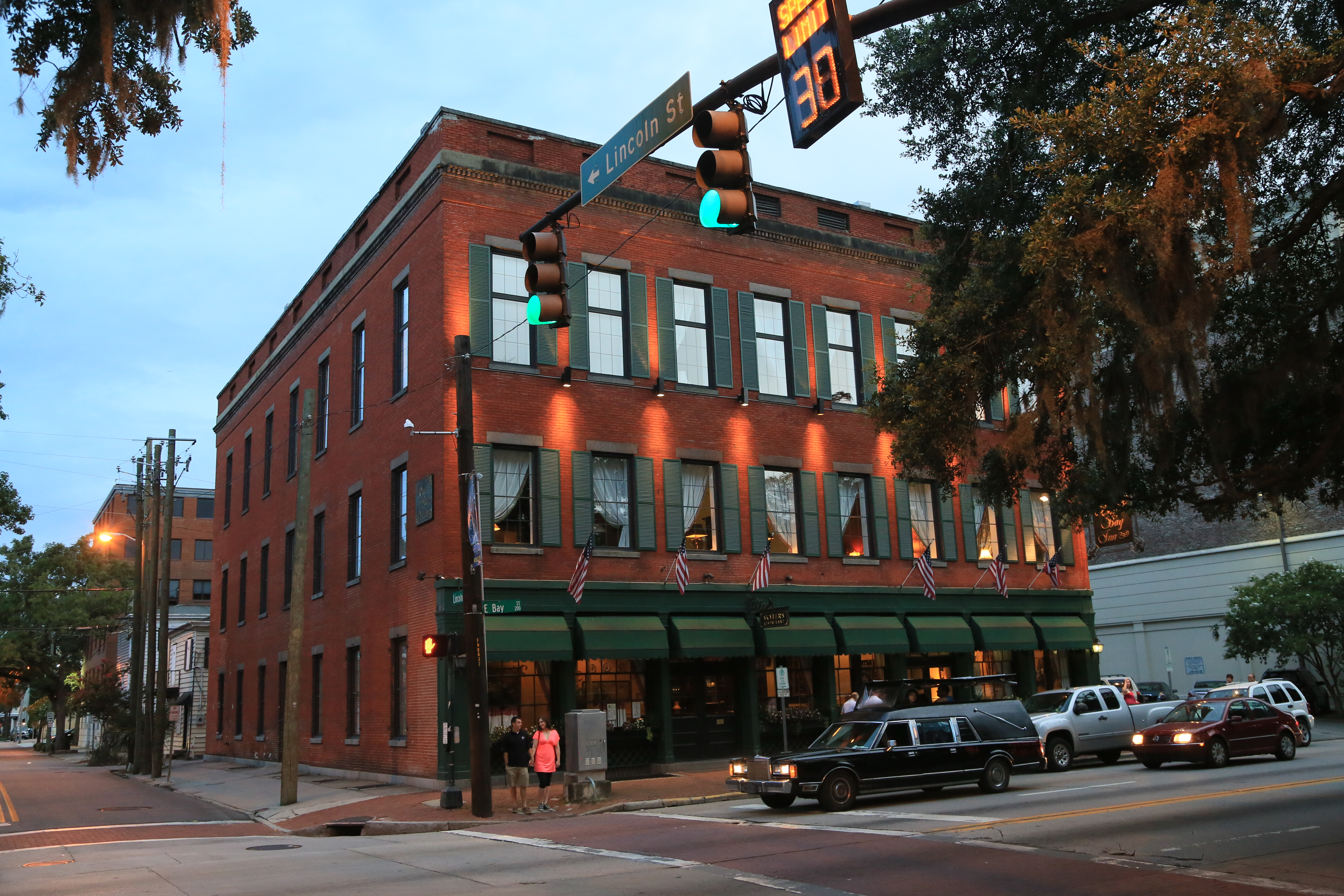
229–233 East Bay Street, directly across Lincoln Street from 301 East Bay, built in 1853

In 1841, Padelford became a founding member of Savannah's St. John's Episcopal Church, and became one of the first citizens to buy a family pew. His son, Edward, married Mary Katherine Steenbergen at the church on November 13, 1855. His daughter, Marion, also married Francis Charles Foster, of Boston, Massachusetts, there on November 24, 1857.

Also in 1841, Padelford's interest in the arts resulted in his bringing a representation in mosaic form of the ruins of Paestum to Savannah for public display. He had purchased it for $5,000 during a summer visit to Rome.

The Committee of Appeals of the Savannah Chamber of Commerce had Padelford elected to its ranks in early 1842.

Padelford constructed the building at today's 301 East Bay Street in 1851. He also had built the structure directly across Lincoln Street (today's East Bay Inn) at 229–233 East Bay Street.

Due to his many commitments, Padelford resigned his presidency of the Marine and Fire Insurance Bank in June 1853. The previous month, he had purchased the Fay House on the southwestern corner of Bull Street and Liberty Street.

In 1854, Padelford was appointed one of the four directors of the Iron Steamboat Company.

In December 1854, a locomotive of Macon and Western Railroad made a visit to Savannah. It was named the Edward Padelford.

Padelford ended his retirement from the banking industry in February 1855 after once again being elected a director of the Marine and Fire and Insurance Bank. The same month he was elected First Vice-President of the Savannah Chamber of Commerce. Also that year, he was a member of the grand jury of the First Panel Superior Court of Chatham County, which recommended a new jail be constructed.

Savannah Gas Company elected Padelford one of its directors in April 1856.

In 1859, Padelford served on the grand jury of the City Court.

During the American Civil War, Padelford was a partner with Randolph L. Mott in a cotton-purchasing business.

Shortly after the war, which cost him his two sons, Padelford was elected as a delegate to visit Washington, D.C., to represent the sentiments of the Chatham County citizens to President Andrew Johnson.

He was elected as a director of Central Railroad and Banking Company in 1867. Four months later, he was selected as an officer for the Union Society at Bethesda.

Padelford accepted his final role in March 1869, at the age of 69. He became one of two directors of the Cotton States Life Insurance Company.

In the summer of 1869, Padelford's health deteriorated, which brought to an end his many activities. "His once familiar figure was seldom seen on the streets of Savannah," wrote Larry Tinker in his Short Biography of Edward Padelford.

=== Philanthropy ===
Padelford was an active contributor to the poor and underprivileged, as well as being a contributor to several charities. Each spring, over several years, he donated $1,000 to the Union Society at Bethesda, and in May 1869 made a gift in five times that amount. He also donated $4,000 to the Episcopal Church's orphan home, and $10,000 towards the construction of a suitable building to accommodate "the sick, poor, aged and infirm colored people of Savannah."

== Personal life ==
Padelford married Elizabeth Louisa Farnum, of Providence, Rhode Island, on November 11, 1823. In 1824 they had a daughter, Mary Elizabeth, who died a month after her first birthday. They had another daughter, Elizabeth, in 1826, but she died at three months. They had four other children, who survived into adulthood: Carolina (1827–1858), Edward (1831–1863), Marion (1833–1923) and George (1835–1861). George, who was born in Naples, Italy, while his parents were on a tour, graduated from Savannah Medical College in 1856.

After seeing two of his children wed, Padelford's oldest child, Carolina, died in 1858 at the age of 30.

During the Civil War, George served with the Oglethorpe Light Infantry. He died on July 28, 1861, at Capon Springs, Virginia, aged 26. He had sustained wounds prior to the First Battle of Bull Run. Edward Jr., meanwhile, joined the artillery company of the Savannah Volunteer Guard in 1861, and he rose in rank quickly. He died on June 7, 1863, of typhoid fever. He was 32, and left a wife, Mary Katherine Padelford (née Steenbergen), and two young children.

Padelford's nephew, through Marion, was Francis Apthorp Foster, a writer from Massachusetts.

== Death ==
Padelford's wife of 46 years and one week died on November 18, 1869, and he followed seven months later, on June 27, 1870, aged 71. Marion, his only surviving child, was with him at his home at the time of his death, and lived for a further 53 years. She died in Cambridge, Massachusetts, in 1923, aged 90, eight years after her husband. Only one other member of his immediate family outlived him – his sister Abigail, who died in 1873 in her mid-70s. He also left four grandchildren.

The Padelford family plot is located in Savannah's Bonaventure Cemetery, in section D, lots 6 and 9.

=== Legacy ===
After his death, Savannah named its Padelford Ward for him. It is bound by Park Avenue to the north, Anderson Street to the south, Atlantic Street to the west and Paulsen Street to the east.
