= Philbrick–Eastman House =

Building in Savannah, Georgia, US

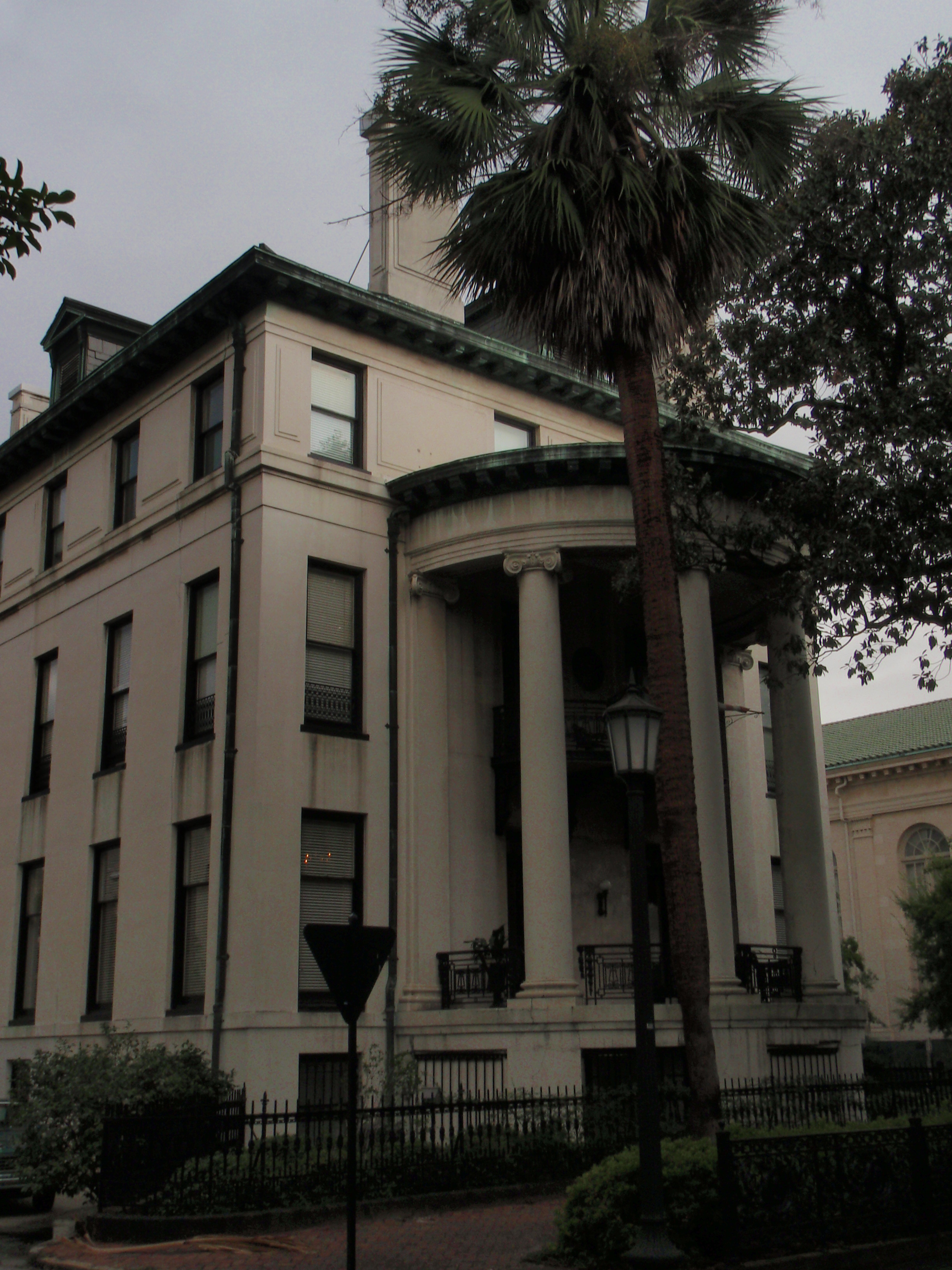
- The Bull Street façade in 2010
- Interactive map of the Philbrick–Eastman House area

General information
- Architectural style: Greek Revival
- Location: 17 West McDonough Street, Savannah, Georgia, United States
- Coordinates: 32.0758°N 81.0939°W
- Construction started: 1844
- Completed: 1847; 179 years ago
- Owner: The Parker Companies

Technical details
- Floor count: 4 (including basement)
- Floor area: 12,000 sq ft

Design and construction
- Architect: Charles B. Cluskey

The Philbrick–Eastman House is a historic building in Savannah, Georgia, United States. Built in 1847, in the Greek Revival style, it is located at 17 West McDonough Street in the southwestern trust/civic lot of Chippewa Square. Designed by Charles B. Cluskey, it was once known as "the finest home in the city." Originally two floors, a third was added in 1911.

The building was extensively renovated into commercial office space in the 1950s, while a 2015 rehabilitation project kept many of the alterations in order to maintain the accuracy of the architectural evolution of the structure, which was originally meant to be the residence of Moses Eastman (1794–1850), a local silversmith, but it was initially the home of Samuel Philbrick (1793–1855), and by the time of its completion, in 1847, that of John Stoddard (1809–1879), later president of the Georgia Historical Society. An elevator from 1912 and a steel vault from 1953 were preserved, and glass partitions were added to mirror the open floor plan of the mid-20th century stenographer's pool.

In 2016, the building's redevelopers won an "Excellence in Rehabilitation" award from the Georgia Trust for Historic Preservation.

As of 2021, it is the headquarters of The Parker Companies.

The building's iron railings feature medallions of prominent men.

It is included in the Savannah Historic District

== Gallery ==
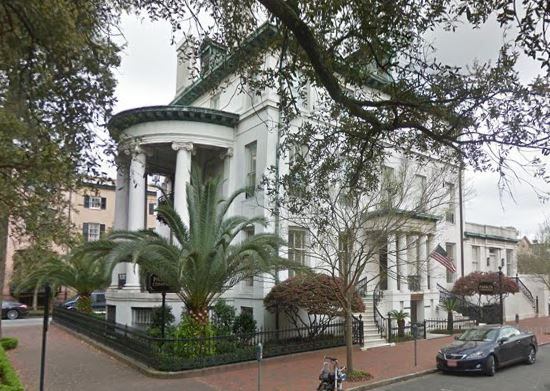
View from McDonough Street
