= Makonikey =

Coordinates: 41°27′33.10″N 70°39′18.49″W

Makonikey is a rural neighborhood on Martha's Vineyard, Massachusetts, that lies on the border of Tisbury (also known as Vineyard Haven) and West Tisbury. The Tisbury section is called Lower Makonikey, and the West Tisbury section is called Upper Makonikey. The neighborhood lies between Lambert's Cove Road and the Vineyard Sound, near Makonikey Point. It is a 5- to 10-minute drive from the center of Vineyard Haven.

The neighborhood is named after Makonikey point. It is referred to in 18th-century records variously as "Conaconaket" and "Nowconaca" and "Necorneca", corruptions of the Wampanoag term for "old land" or "ancient place."

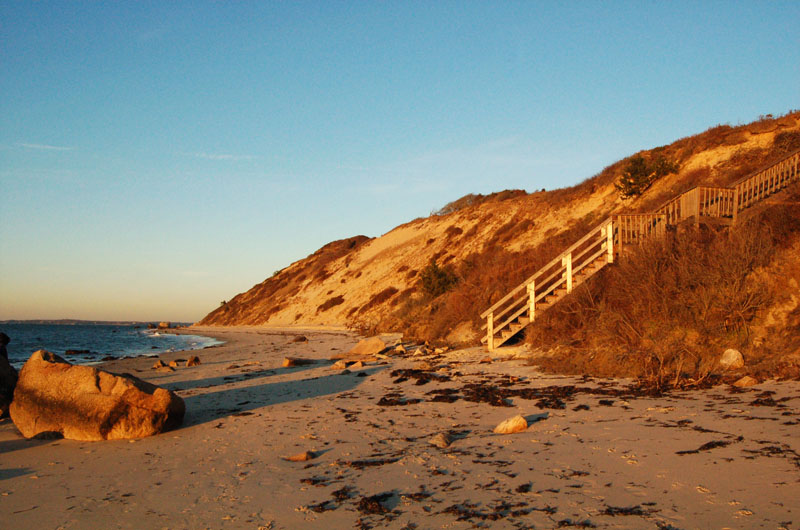
Makonikey Beach cliffs in Fall 2007.

In the late 19th and early 20th centuries, Makonikey was known for its grand hotel, long since torn down.

Today the area is semi-rural, with houses generally located on lots of greater than 3 acres (12,000 m^{2}). The general feeling is that of "Up Island" even though the location is right on the edge of "Down Island". The winding dirt roads through the woods can be quite confusing, and are not properly marked either on maps or GPS - many of the roads listed are in fact "paper" roads, and still forested. As a result, most residents have affixed signs to direct visitors and delivery people to their houses (car GPS and online mapping services have not historically accurately mapped the area, but Google Maps has recently been updated with an accurate map of the area). These signs are usually in the form of some local animal or object, and are still the easiest way of finding most of the houses.

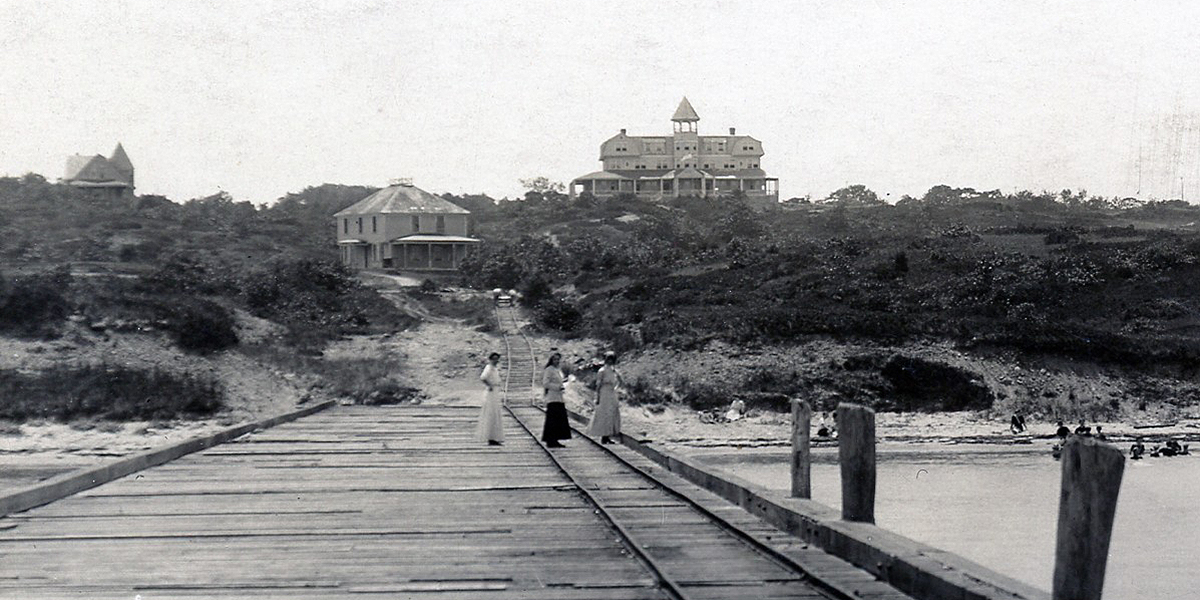
This postcard, date unknown, reads, "This shows the big house, part of the wharf and the bathing beach at Makonikey. We are just opposite to Woods Hole, 3 miles from Vineyard Haven and about 5 from Oak Bluffs. We are planning to sail to Gay Head to-day. Are having a good time. H. H. Carey to Mr. Charles R. Bemis, Northboro, Mass."

Like the majority of Martha's Vineyard housing stock, most of the houses in Makonikey are used as summer residences. Lower Makonikey has more year-round residents, and is considered one of the more desirable neighborhoods in Vineyard Haven, as the houses and lots tend to be larger than usual for that town, combined with waterviews and beach access (this is generally true of the neighborhoods in Vineyard Haven between Lamberts Cove Road and the Vineyard Sound, Northern Pines, Pilot Hill, and Lower Makonikey)

Lower Makonikey and Upper Makonikey are the subject of 2 separate associations, the Lower Makonikey Corporation and the Upper Makonikey Trust. The associations' main duties are road and beach maintenance. Beach access is private, like many other beaches in Massachusetts.
