= Lambert's Cove =

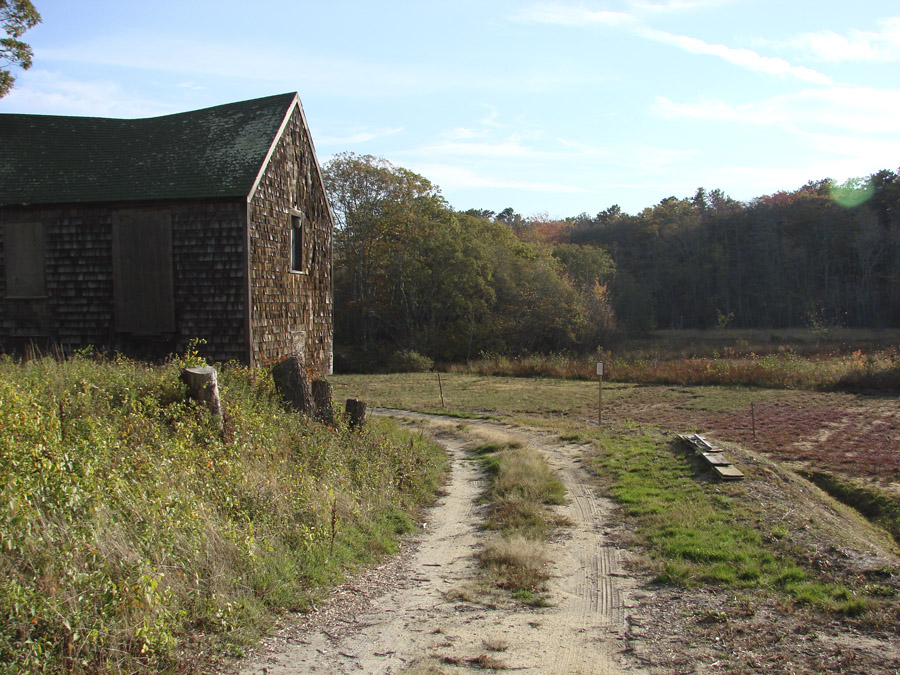
The Old Cranberry Bog

Lambert's Cove is a region in Tisbury and West Tisbury, Massachusetts, on the island of Martha's Vineyard. It extends from Upper Lambert's Cove in west Tisbury to Lower Lambert's Cove in Tisbury. Lambert's Cove Road accesses several roads of note, including Makonikey and Longview. It is known for its views of the hilly region of "up island." The road is one of the only access to West Tisbury's north shore coastline, and accesses the only public beach of the town. Some sites of note found along Lambert's Cove include Lambert's Cove Beach, Makonikey beach, Cottle's lumberyard, the old cranberry bog, Duarte's Pond and Seth's Pond. It also accesses the FOCUS Study Center, a faith-based summer camp near Seth's Pond.

== Road ==
Lambert's Cove Road is separated into two sections. Lower Lambert's Cove begins in the Town of Tisbury and contains the old cranberry bog. Upper Lambert's Cove begins in the center of West Tisbury and accesses Lambert's Cove Beach, Seth's Pond and the FOCUS Study Center. It is the sole access to a large number of summer and year-round residences.
