= Unitarian Universalist Church (Savannah, Georgia) =

- "Jingle Bells" Church
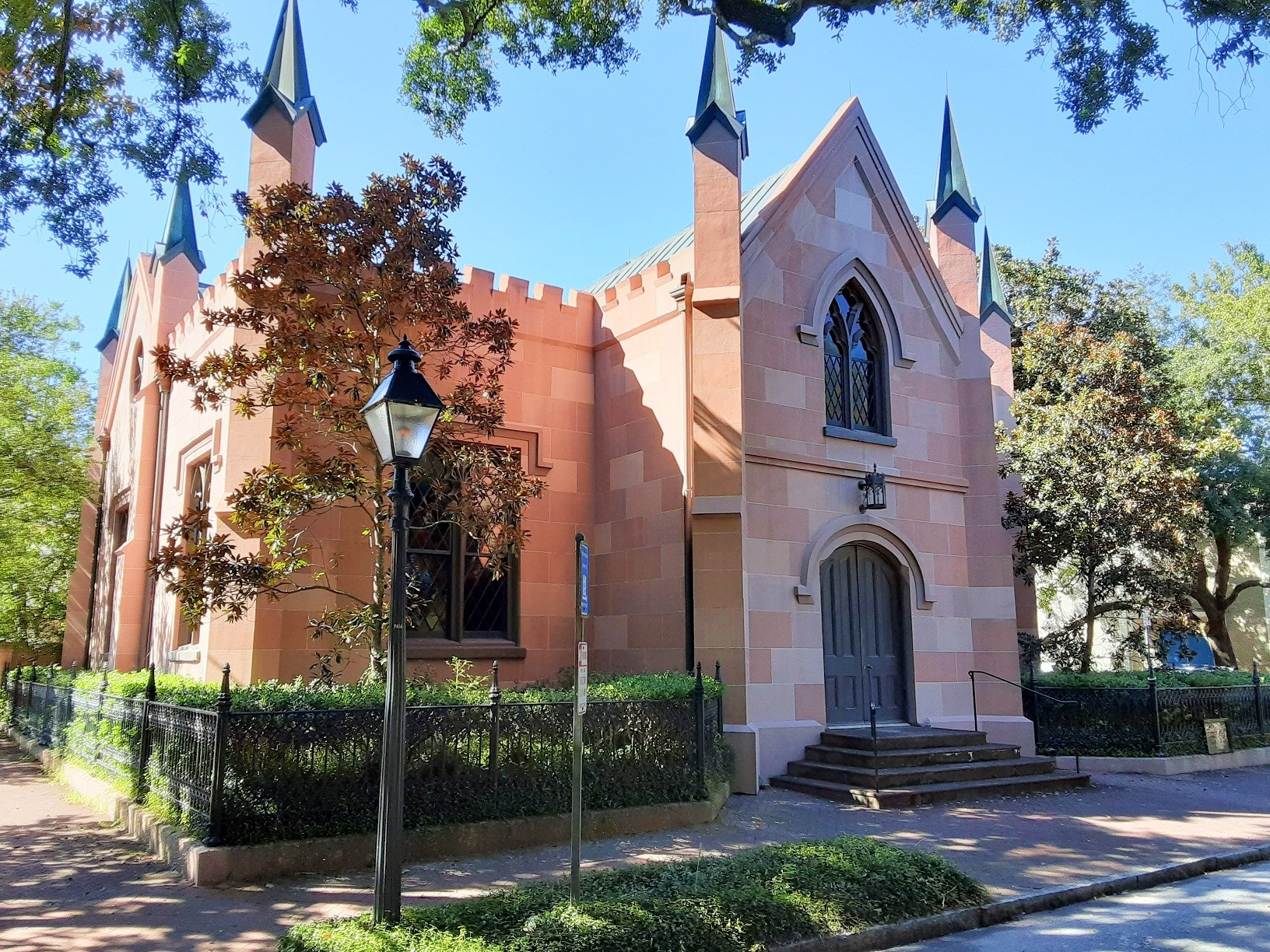
- Unitarian Universalist Church
- 32.0726°N 81.0899°W
- Location: 325 Habersham Street, Troup Square, Savannah, Georgia
- Country: United States
- Denomination: Unitarian Universalist
- Website: Official website

History
- Status: open
- Founder: Moses Eastman

Architecture
- Functional status: used
- Architect: John S. Norris
- Years built: 1851

The Unitarian Universalist Church is a historic church at 325 Habersham Street in Savannah, Georgia, United States. It is located in the northwestern civic block of Troup Square. It was designed by noted architect John S. Norris in 1851 and built with funds left in his will by Moses Eastman, a local silversmith and councillor.

The Christmas carol "Jingle Bells" was written by the church's music director James Lord Pierpont (1822–1893), supposedly while living in Savannah. The city of Medford, Massachusetts, also claims that the song was written there in 1850, but it has been proven that Pierpont had moved to the west coast to partake in the California Gold Rush at that point. What is known is that he copyrighted the song, with the name "The One Horse Open Sleigh", on September 16, 1857, while he was living in Savannah.

The church was physically moved from Oglethorpe Square to the western side of Troup Square, a distance of a third of a mile, in 1860.

== Gallery ==
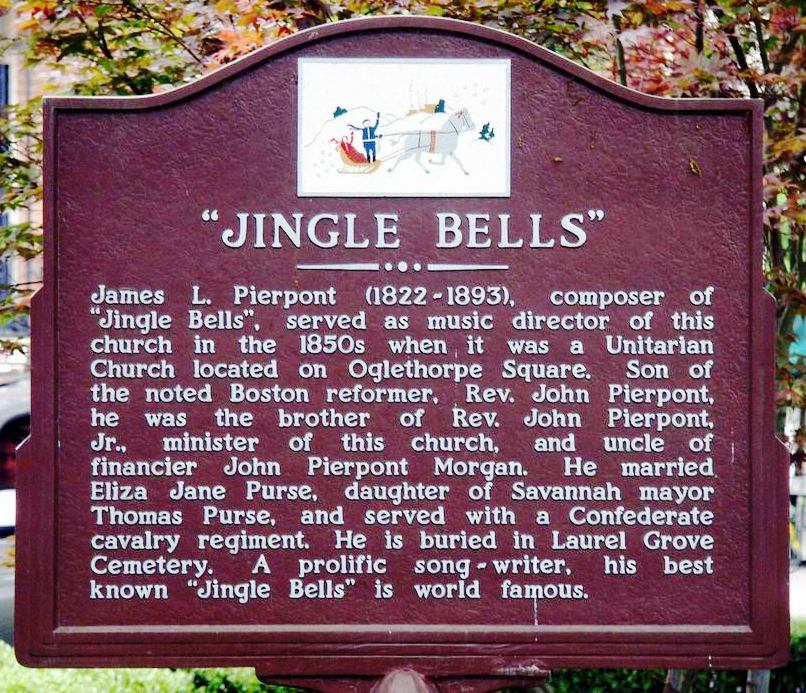
Historical marker in Savannah, Georgia
