= Moses Eastman =

American silversmith (1794–1850)

- Born: June 17, 1794; Concord, New Hampshire, U.S.
- Died: May 24, 1850 (aged 55); Savannah, Georgia, U.S.
- Occupation: Silversmith

Moses Eastman (June 17, 1794 – May 24, 1850) was an American silversmith based in Savannah, Georgia. He was also the founder of, and sole benefactor in the construction of, Savannah's Unitarian Universalist Church.

== Early life and career ==
Eastman was born in Concord, New Hampshire, in 1794. He moved to Savannah around 1820 and joined the partnership of J. Penfield & Co., which comprised Connecticut native Josiah Penfield (1785–1828) and Frederick Marquand (1799–1882). He became a partner with Penfield in 1826. That partnership dissolved when Penfield died in 1828. Eastman then started out on his own, working under his own name.

In 1830, Eastman was a city constable, and in 1844 was appointed keeper of the Savannah city clock.

After Eastman's death in 1850, George M. Griffen continued the business. Griffen had worked for Eastman as a watchmaker.

Some of Eastman's work was displayed in Savannah's Telfair Museums in 2010 during its "Silver in Savannah" exhibit. Silver has played a major part in Savannah's history since its founder Captain James Oglethorpe arrived in 1733.

== Personal life ==
Eastman married New Jersey native Elizabeth Tuthill (1799–1883) in 1834 in Savannah. Nine years later, they purchased 233 Bull Street, in the southwest residential block of Chippewa Square. Its construction was started the previous year by Samuel Philbrick. The couple later started building today's Philbrick–Eastman House, at 17 West McDonough Street, in the southwestern civic/trust lot of the square; however, by the time of its 1847 completion, it was purchased by John Stoddard (1809–1879), later president of the Georgia Historical Society.

== Death ==
Eastman died on May 24, 1850, aged 55, in Savannah. He was buried in Pine Grove Cemetery in East Concord, New Hampshire.

Mr. Moses Eastman, who died yesterday morning, had conducted a large and successful business here for many years. Upright in his dealings, warm in his friendships and ardent in his affections, he has left a cherished wife and many admiring friends to deplore his untimely death. — Eastman's obituary

After Eastman's death, his widow moved to Madison in her native New Jersey. She survived her husband by 33 years and was buried beside him.

In his will, Eastman left $2,525 to build a parsonage (which formerly stood at 123 Abercorn Street on Oglethorpe Square) and a more substantial brick and mortar Unitarian Universalist Church. It was completed a year after his death. The church was physically moved to Troup Square in 1860.

One of his last acts of his life was to contract for the erection of a church on Oglethorpe Square, to be presented to the Religious Society of which he was a member. His magnificent design will not be frustrated by his death. — Eastman's obituary
