= Big Giant Swords =

- Genre: Entertainment
- Presented by: Michael Craughwell
- Country of origin: United States
- Original language: English
- No. of seasons: 1
- No. of episodes: 6

Production
- Camera setup: Multiple
- Running time: 42 minutes
- Production company: Thinkfactory Media

Original release
- Network: Discovery Channel
- Release: January 13 – February 17, 2015

Big Giant Swords is an American television series that premiered on January 13, 2015 on the Discovery Channel. The program follows sword maker Michael "Irish Mike" Craughwell as he and his associates create custom oversized swords from scratch for his clients. Episodes focus on the creation process of one or two commissioned weapons as the team attempts to complete them to the customer's satisfaction in a set time period.

== Background ==
Craughwell first began making giant swords in 2003 as a hobby and models many of his works after swords found in video games and other fictional media. Craughwell first garnered attention for his creations after posting videos of himself wielding the weapons on YouTube. He is based out of West Tisbury, MA on the island of Martha's Vineyard.

== Episodes ==
- Episode 1: Zeus Almighty
- Episode 2: The Dragon Slayer
- Episode 3: Beast from Below
- Episode 4: The Junkyard Crasher
- Episode 5: Hells Hound
- Episode 6: The Destroyer
