= Nancy Luce =

American poet and folk artist

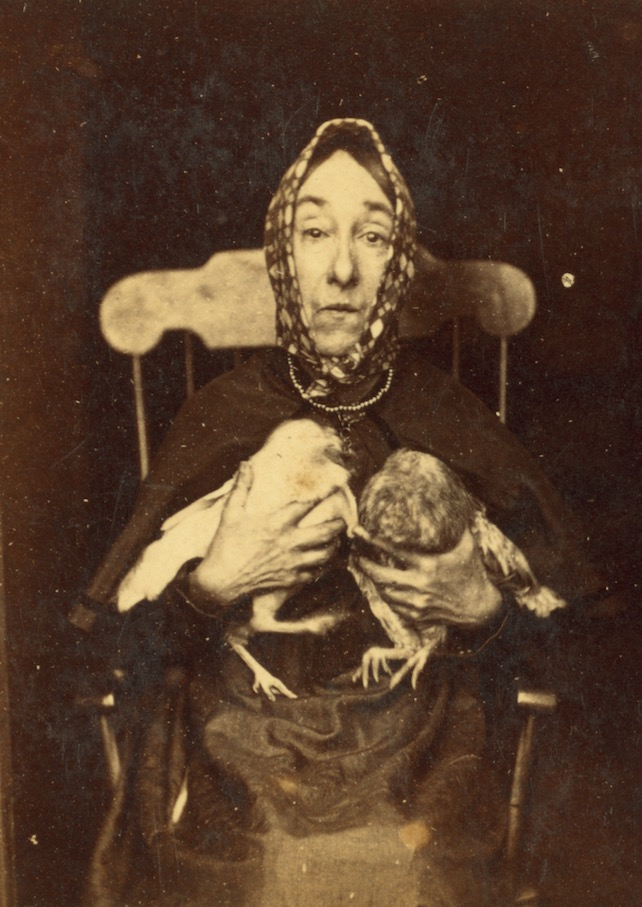
- Portrait of Nancy Luce, island eccentric, and her bantie hens.
- Born: August 23, 1814; West Tisbury, Massachusetts, U.S.
- Died: April 9, 1890 (aged 75); West Tisbury, Massachusetts, U.S.
- Occupations: Folk artist, poet, businesswoman

Nancy Luce (August 23, 1814 – April 9, 1890) was a poet and folk artist who lived in West Tisbury, Massachusetts on Martha's Vineyard.

== Biography ==
Luce was orphaned by her parents, Philip Luce and Anne Manter, in her late twenties and suffered a debilitating disease leaving her nearly homebound at the family farmhouse. She raised bantam hens to survive, often giving them fanciful names such as Ottee Ophete, Pondy Lilly and Letoogie Tickling. She wrote and self-published poetry pamphlets about her chickens and got professional portraits done of them and herself. Tourists would come to her cottage and small store on the property to visit with her and purchase keepsakes to bring home. As she buried her chickens on the property, her collection of chicken gravestones became its own tourist attraction. She was considered "one of the Island's most well-known historical figures."

When Luce died, the chicken gravestones were given to the town library. Luce herself is buried in the West Tisbury cemetery, where her marble gravestone is decorated with chickens.

== Legacy ==
Luce's chicken names live on in the names of chickens at the Los Angeles Zoo. Composer Thomas LaVoy is currently working on a commissioned choral piece based on her writings. Vineyard artist Daniel Waters has created a series of linoleum block prints featuring Luce and her chickens.

Nancy Luce's manuscripts and other related material are at the John Hay Library at Brown University.
