= Fellowship of Christians in Universities and Schools =

The Fellowship of Christians in Universities & Schools (FOCUS) is a national, non-denominational Christian fellowship based in Stamford, Connecticut, United States. Though its members live throughout the United States, FOCUS primarily serves independent schools on the east coast. It was founded in 1961 by the Rev. Peter C. Moore. The Executive Director is Dan Walker.

== Organization ==
=== National ===
FOCUS is a national organization that supports programs for independent school students and faculty. FOCUS invites scholars, artists, ministers, and professionals to address students and faculty so that they may investigate a life of faith, and grow both as individuals and as a community. FOCUS' national office is located in New Canaan, CT.

=== Regional ===
In FOCUS' ten areas, staff and volunteers coordinate school meetings, retreats and special programs. For example, FOCUS' Boarding School Ministry is an outreach geared to the specific needs and opportunities of the boarding schools, and FOCUS' New York City region is tailored for the many independent day school students there.

The current regions include Raleigh, NC, Richmond, VA, Washington, DC, Baltimore, MD, Philadelphia, PA, New York City, New England Boarding Schools, Fairfield, CT, Boston, MA and San Francisco, CA.

=== Faculty resources ===
FOCUS' Faculty Ministry works with faculty. It seeks to encourage their professional development, spiritual growth, and training in ministry. The Faculty Ministry provides networking opportunities, hosts an annual summer conference, and offers local faculty retreats.

== National programs ==
FOCUS holds summer programs on its campus on the island of Martha's Vineyard, in the Adirondack Mountains, and hosts service trips in New York City. Over the winter break, FOCUS provides both skiing and non-skiing camps for middle and high school students.
