= Troup Square (Savannah, Georgia) =

Public square in Savannah, Georgia

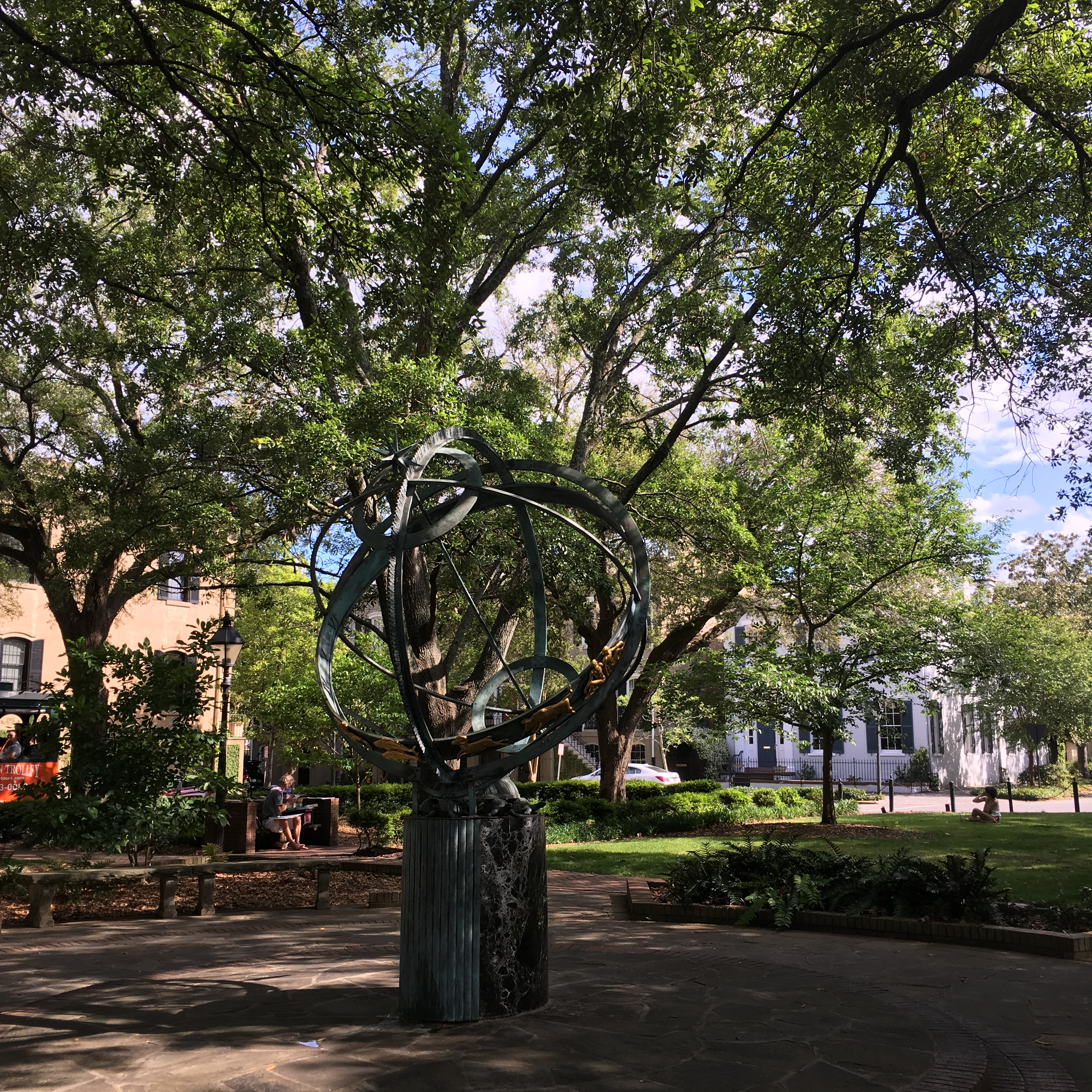
- The armillary sphere in the center of the square
- Interactive map of Troup Square
- Namesake: George Troup
- Maintained by: City of Savannah
- Location: Savannah, Georgia, U.S.
- Coordinates: 32.0724°N 81.0896°W
- North: Habersham Street
- East: East Macon Street
- South: Habersham Street
- West: East Macon Street

Construction
- Completion: 1837 (189 years ago)

Troup Square is one of the 22 squares of Savannah, Georgia, United States. It is located in the fourth row of the city's five rows of squares, on Habersham Street and East Macon Street, and was laid out in 1837. It is south of Colonial Park Cemetery, east of Lafayette Square and north of Whitefield Square. The square is named for George Troup, the former Georgia governor, Congressman and senator. It is one of only two Savannah squares named for a person living at the time, the other being Washington Square.

A large iron armillary sphere stands in the center of the square, supported by six small metal turtles. The armillary has been the source of some controversy, as it is one of the few examples of modern sculpture in the squares.

A special dog fountain is located on the west side of the square. The Myers Drinking Fountain was a gift from Savannah mayor Herman Myers in 1897 and was originally placed in Forsyth Park. When moved to Troup Square, its height was adjusted for use by dogs and has become the site of an annual Blessing of the Animals.

The Unitarian Universalist Church sits on the western side of the square and is its oldest building, albeit not original to the square: built in 1851, it was moved a 0.33 miles (0.53 km) from Oglethorpe Square nine years later. It is believed that James Lord Pierpont wrote the tune to "Jingle Bells" while he was the church's music director, but other sources claim he only copyrighted it when he was in the role, and that he wrote it in Medford, Massachusetts. The oldest building original to the square is the Lewis Cook Duplex, at 313–315 East Charlton Street, which dates to 1852.

In 1969 Savannah landscape architect Clermont Huger Lee and Mills B. Lane planned and initiated a project to remove the central vandalized playground, close the fire lane, install an armillary sundial, and add new walls, benches, lighting, and plantings.

== Dedication ==
Namesake	Image	Note
George Troup		The square is named for George Troup (1780–1856), former governor of Georgia.

== Markers and structures ==
Object	Image	Note
Armillary sphere		A close-up of the sphere.

== Constituent buildings ==
Each building below is in one of the eight blocks around the square composed of four residential "tything" blocks and four civic ("trust") blocks, now known as the Oglethorpe Plan. They are listed with construction years where known.

Northwestern residential/tything lot

- 322–324 East Harris Street (1869)
- 311 Habersham Street – appeared in the movie Midnight in the Garden of Good and Evil as the Myra Bishop Family Clinic the Lady Chablis walks to from her apartment

Northwestern civic/trust lot

- Unitarian Universalist Church, 321 Habersham Street (1851) – oldest building non-original to the square, having been moved from Oglethorpe Square in 1860
- Frances Threadcroaft Duplex, 301–307 East Harris Street (1868)
- Sarah Coombs Property, 309–311 East Harris Street (1863)
- Parsonage of the Unitarian Universalist Church, 313 East Harris Street (1870)

Southwestern residential/tything lot

- John Kenney House, 319 East Charlton Street (1870)
- Michael McQuade House, 317 East Charlton Street (1883)
- Lewis Cook Duplex, 313–315 East Charlton Street (1852) – oldest building original to the square
- Mary Edmundson House, 311 East Charlton Street (1873)
- Charles Lampe Duplex, 301 & 305 East Charlton Street (1855)

Northeastern residential/tything lot

- Cohen Row, 312–320 Habersham Street (1883)

Northeastern civic/trust lot

- 324 Habersham Street (1885)
- Troup Trust, 410–424 East Macon Street (1872–1885) – 410–416 built for Edward Kennedy (1885); 418–424 built for John McDonough (1872)

Southeastern civic/trust lot

- McDonough Row, 410–424 East Charlton Street (1882)

Southeastern residential/tything lot

- Mortimer Williams House, 401 East Charlton Street (1860)
- Dale Row, 405–411 East Charlton Street (1882)
- George Haslam House, 417 East Charlton Street (1872)
- Henry Bragdon/Edward Segur Duplex, 419–421 East Charlton Street (1868)
- Ellen Williams House, 423 East Charlton Street (1867)

== Gallery ==
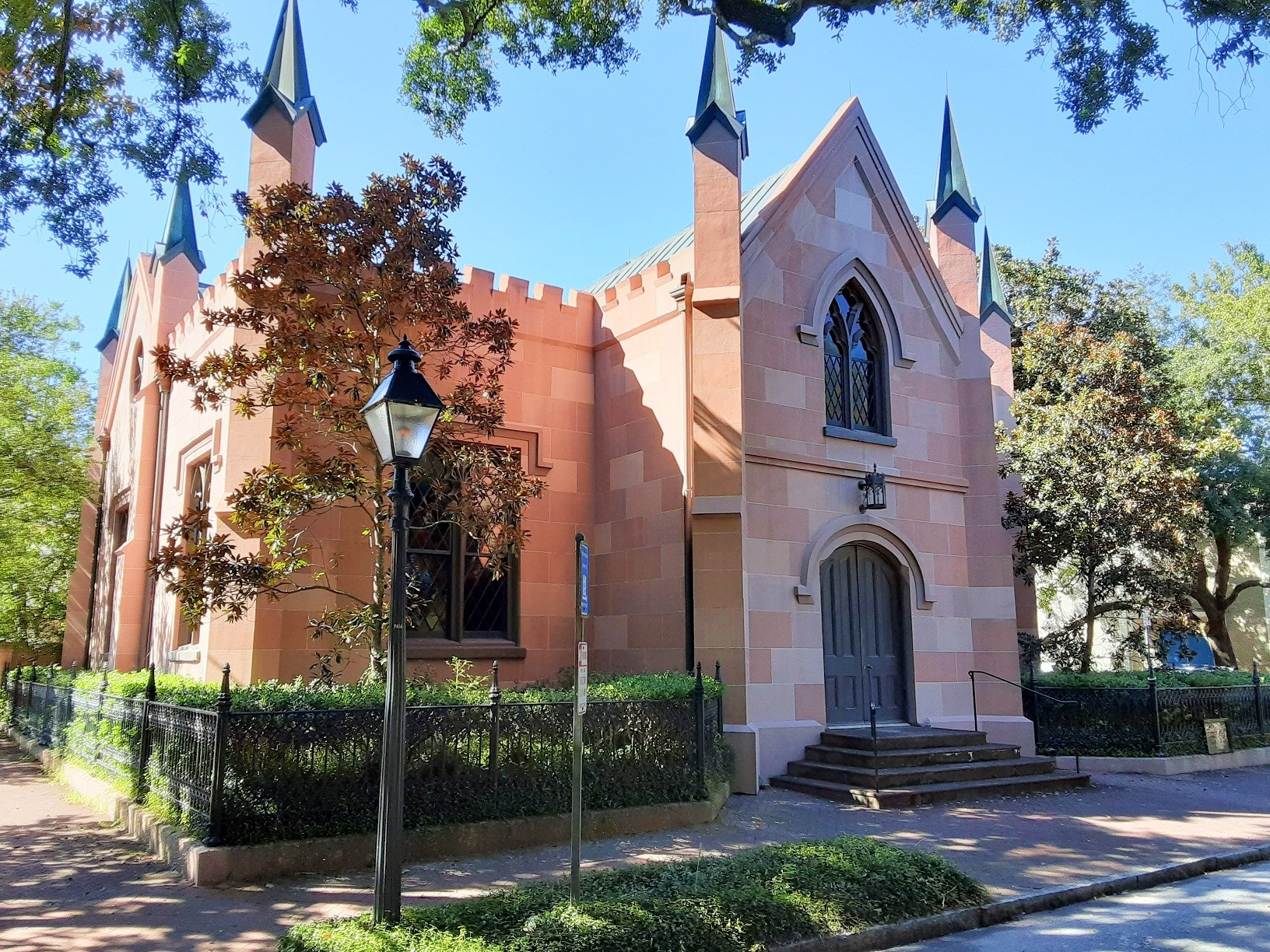
Unitarian Universalist ("Jingle Bells") Church, 321 Habersham Street

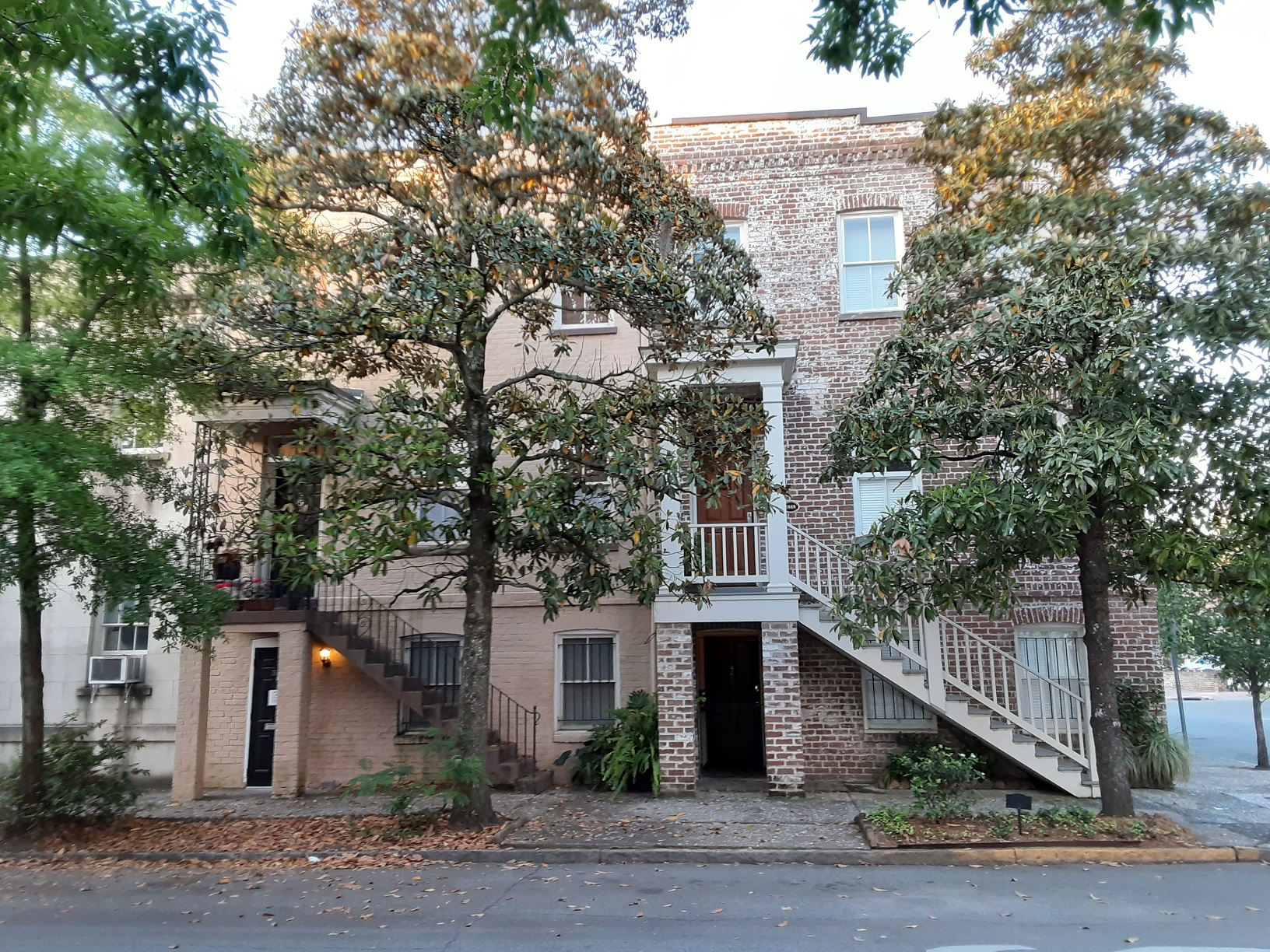
Frances Threadcroaft Duplex, 301–307 East Harris Street

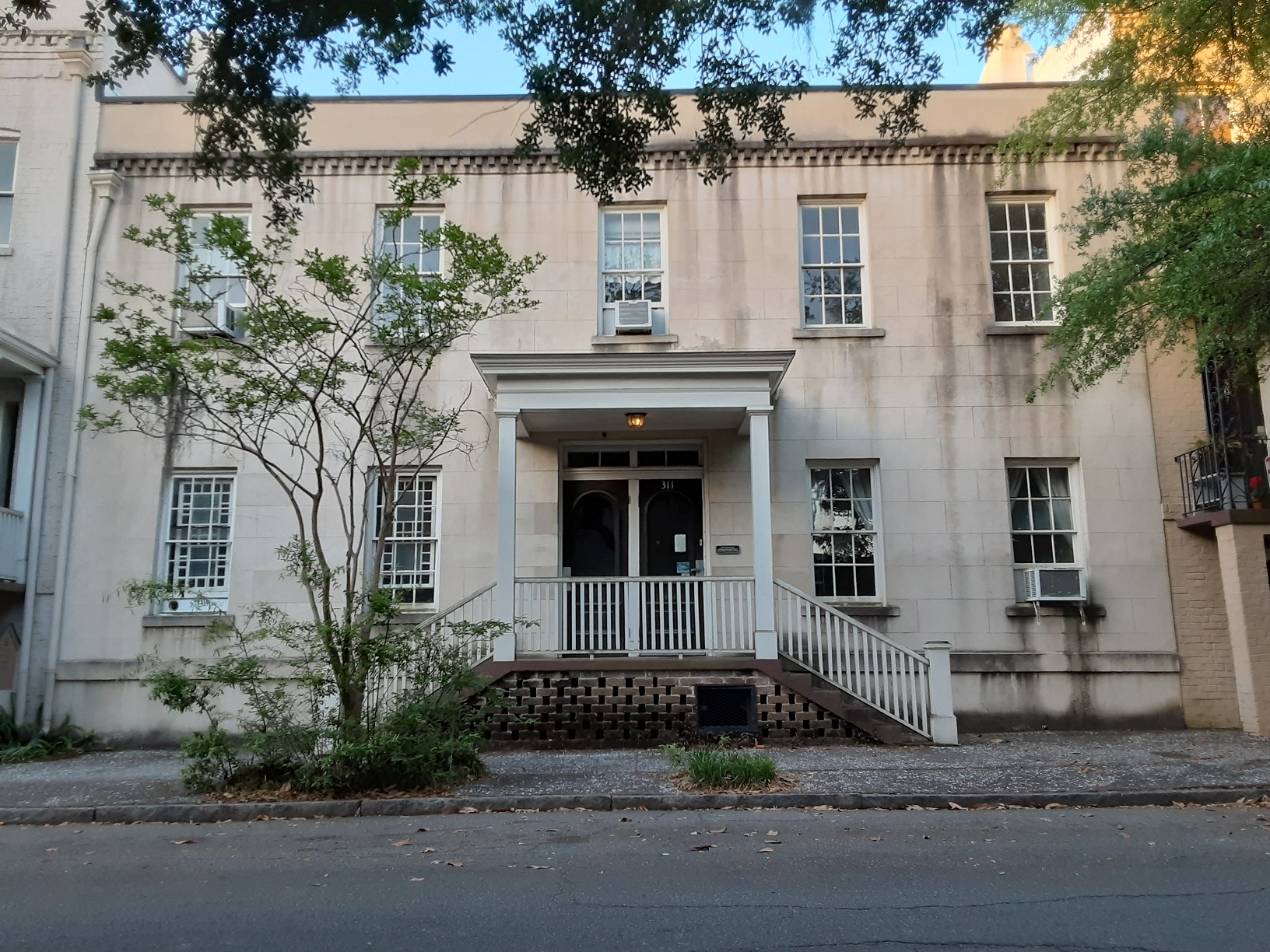
Sarah Coombs Property, 309–311 East Harris Street

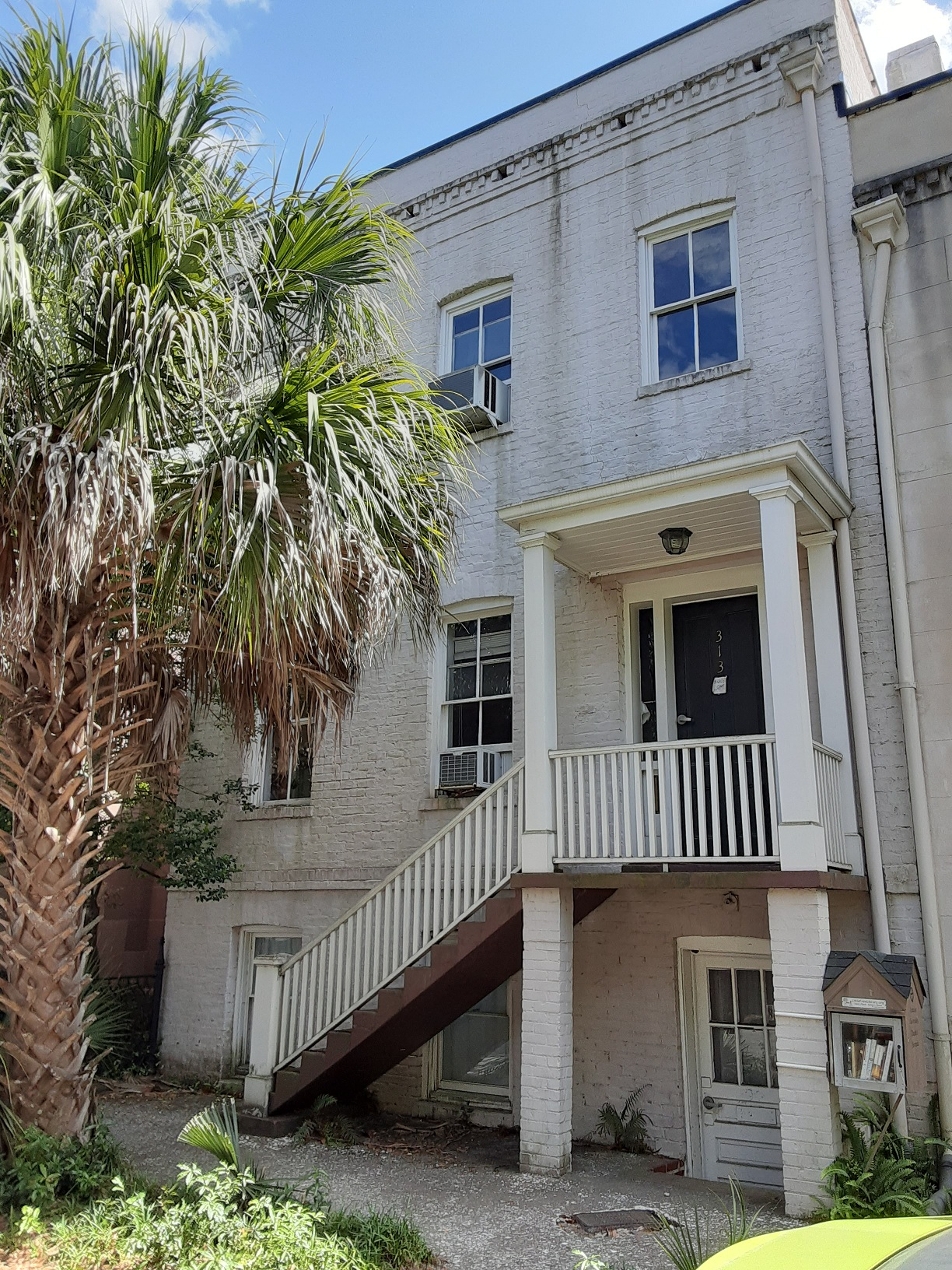
Parsonage of the Universalist Unitarian Church, 313 East Harris Street

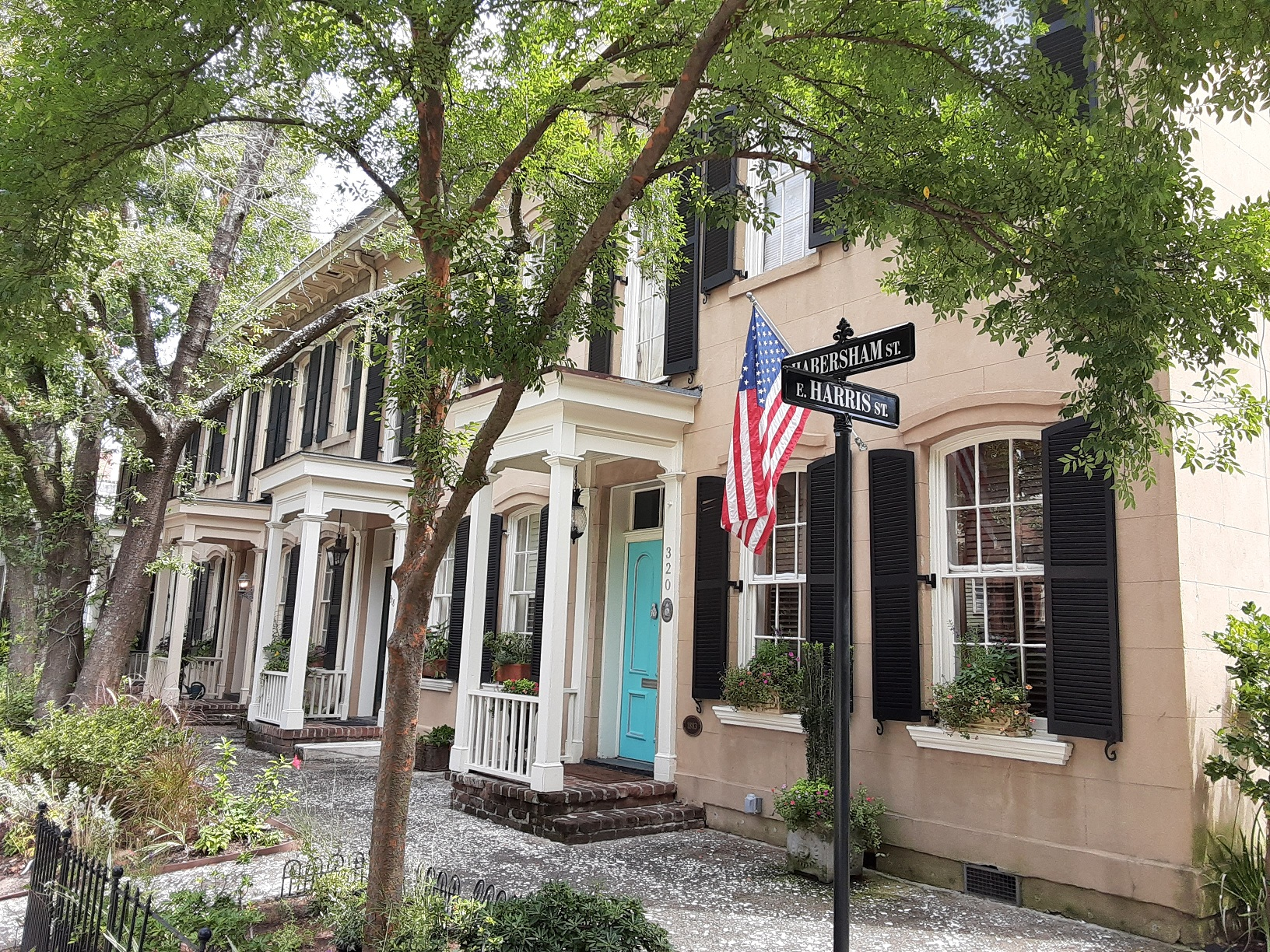
Cohen Row, 312–320 Habersham Street

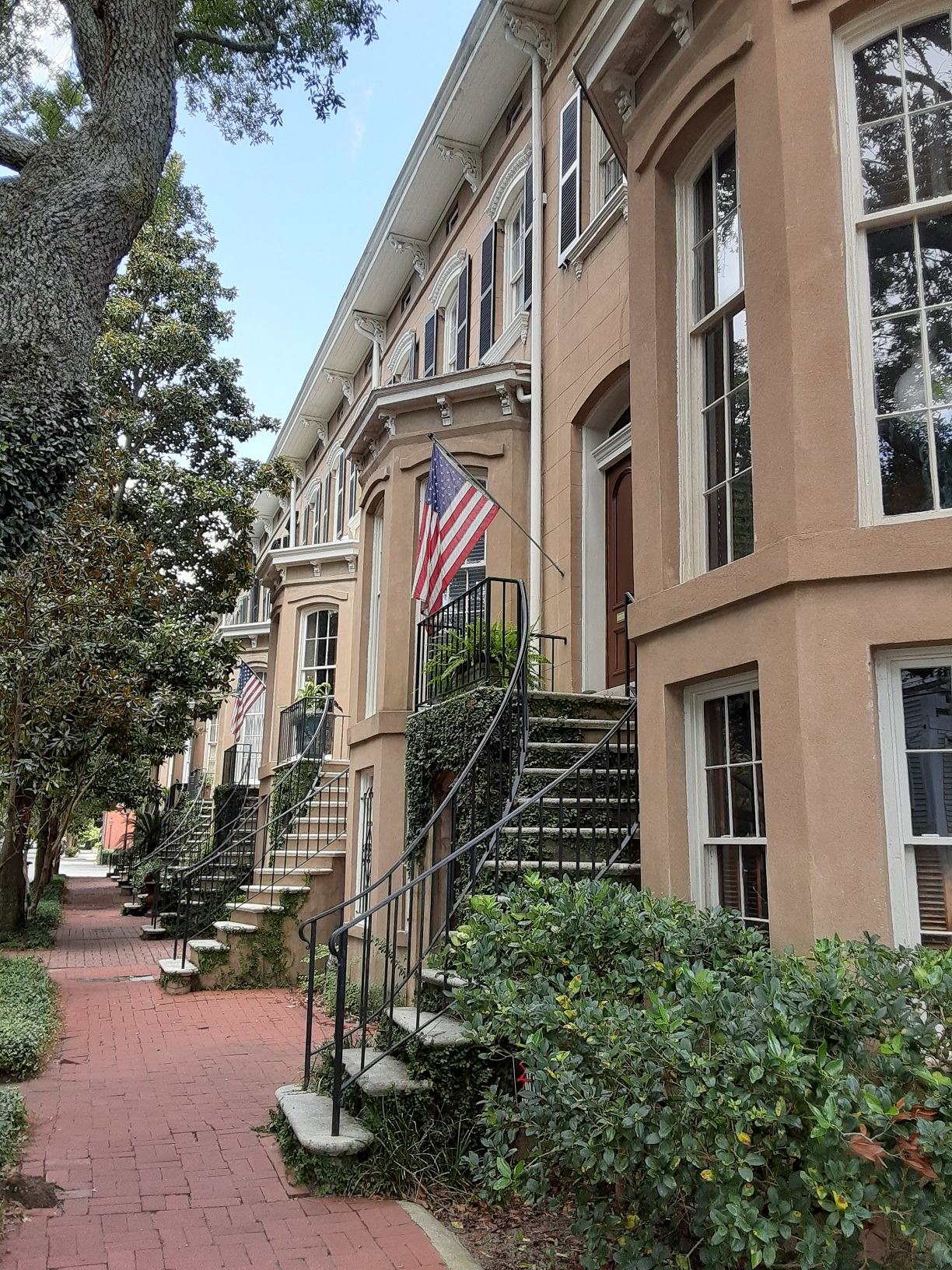
McDonough Row, 410–424 East Charlton Street

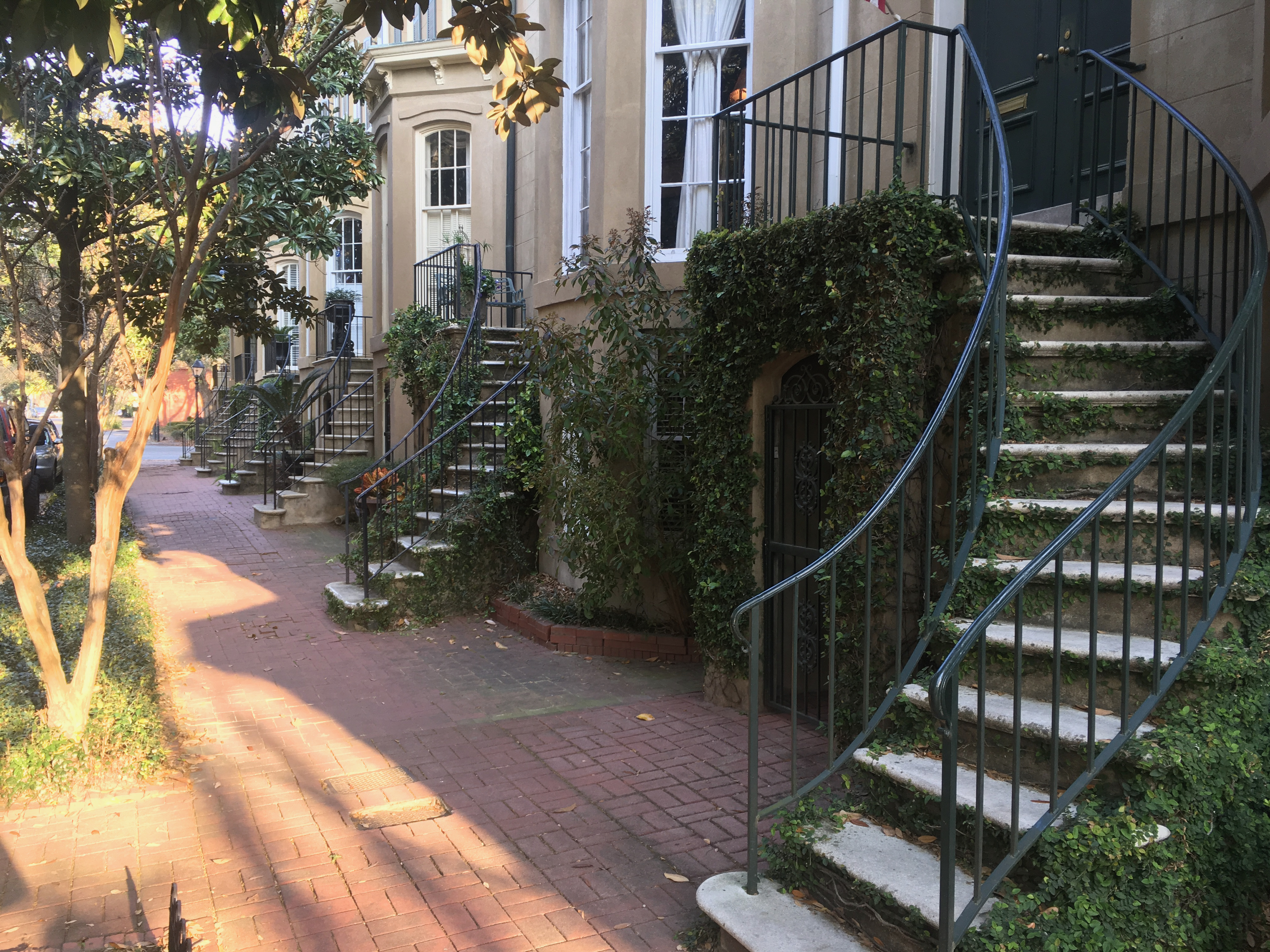
424 East Charlton Street, a bookend of McDonough Row

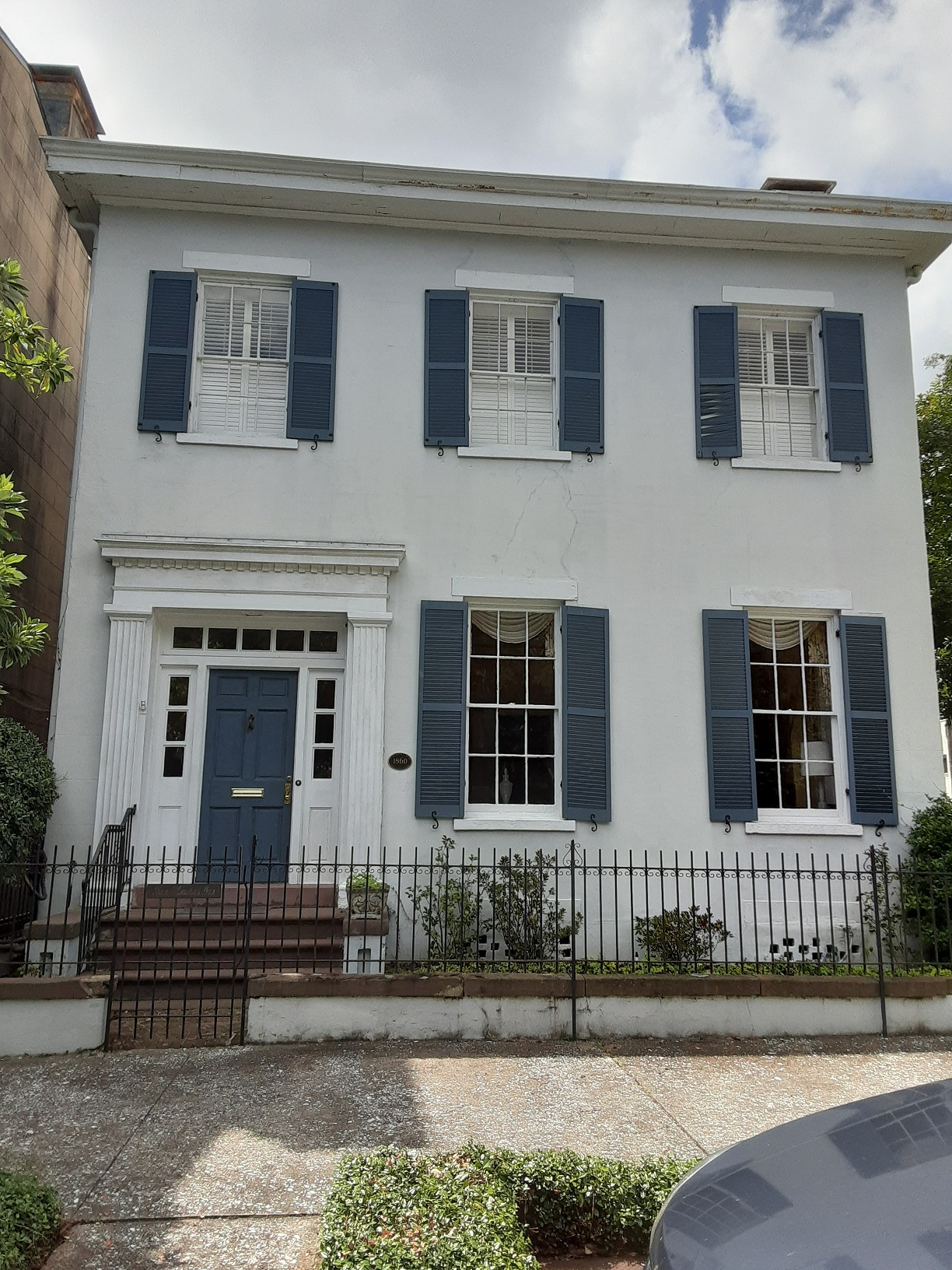
Mortimer Williams House, 401 East Charlton Street

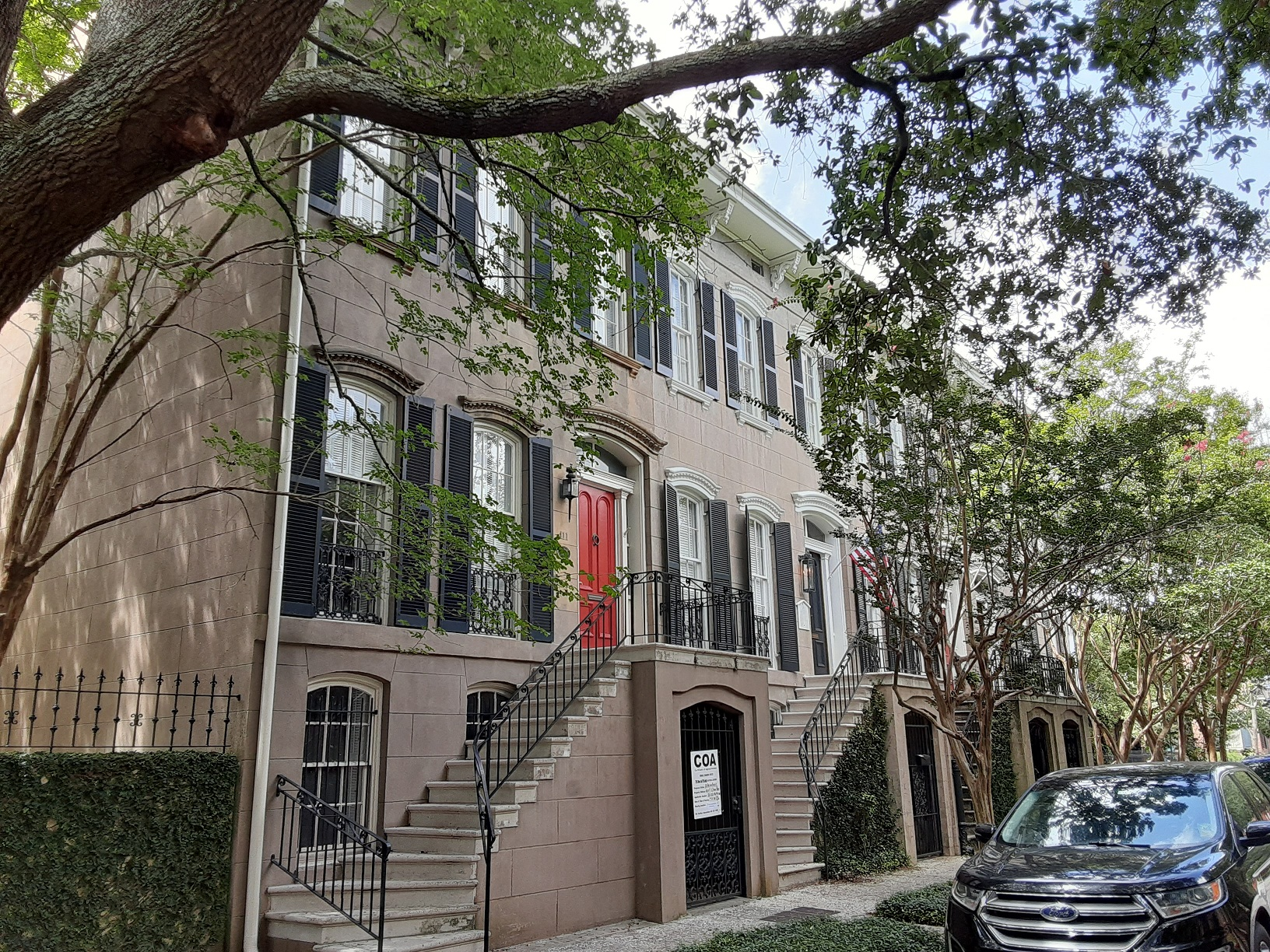
Dale Row, 405–411 East Charlton Street

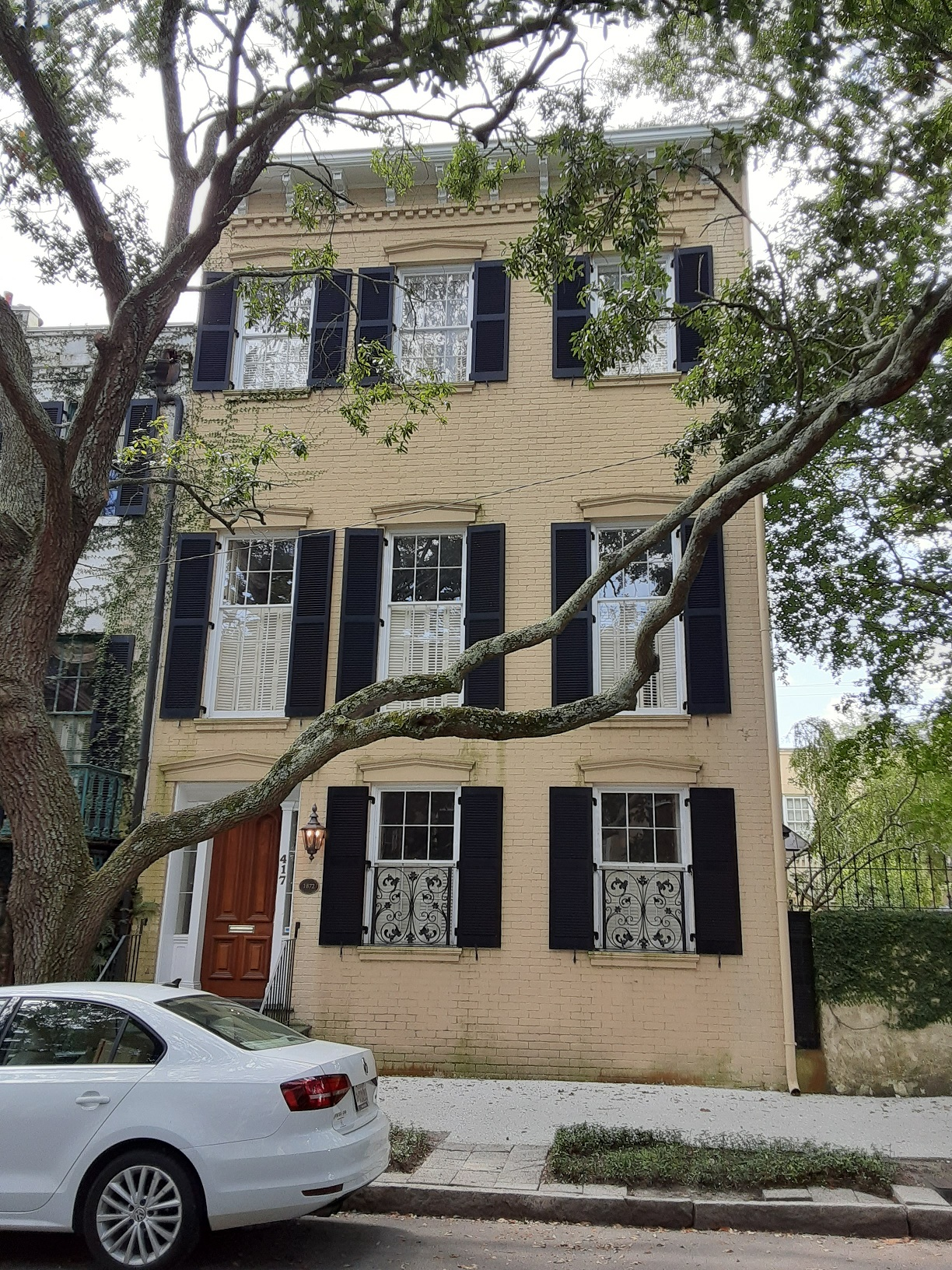
George Haslam House, 417 East Charlton Street

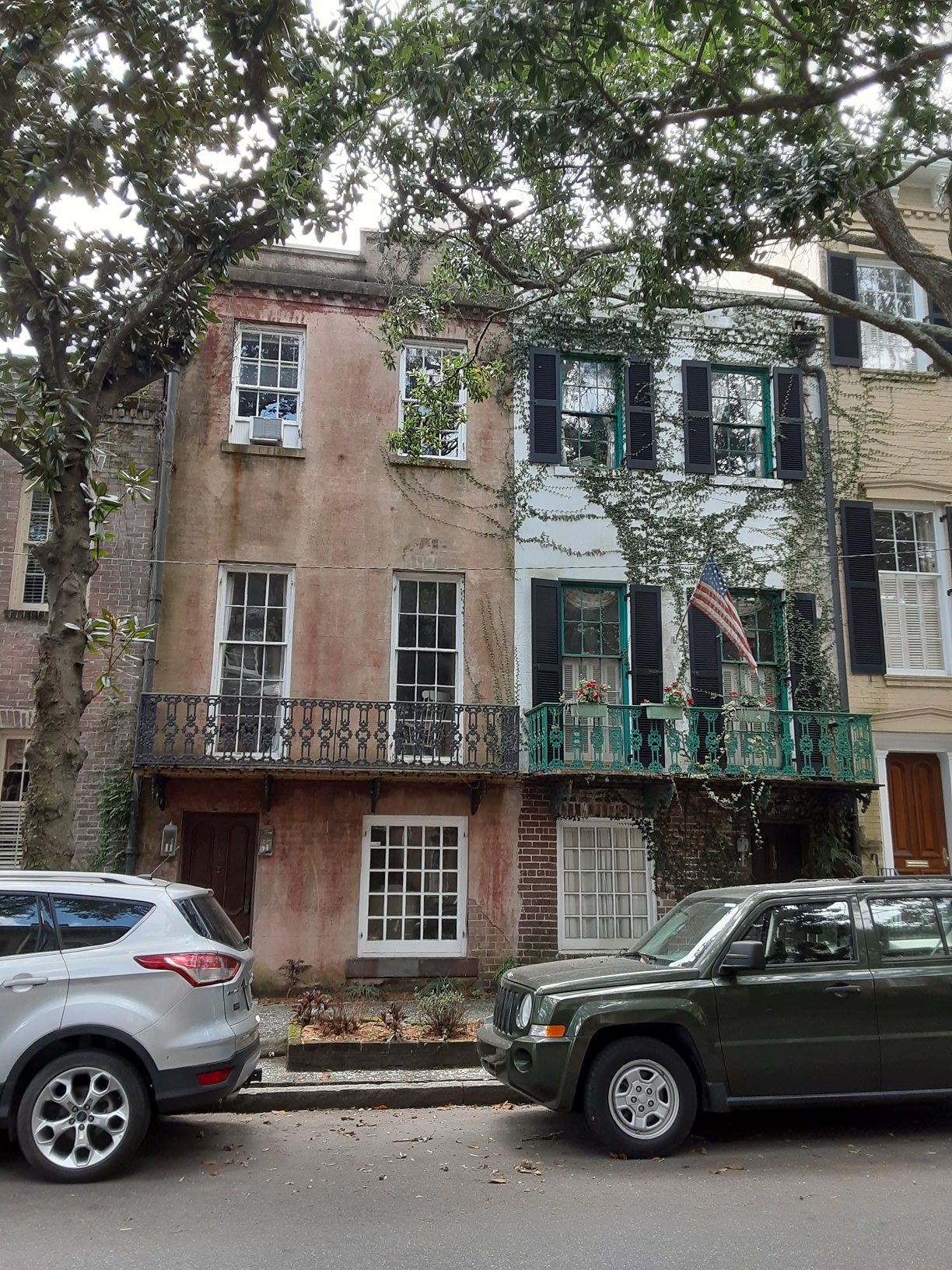
Henry Bragdon/Edward Segur Duplex, 419-421 East Charlton Street

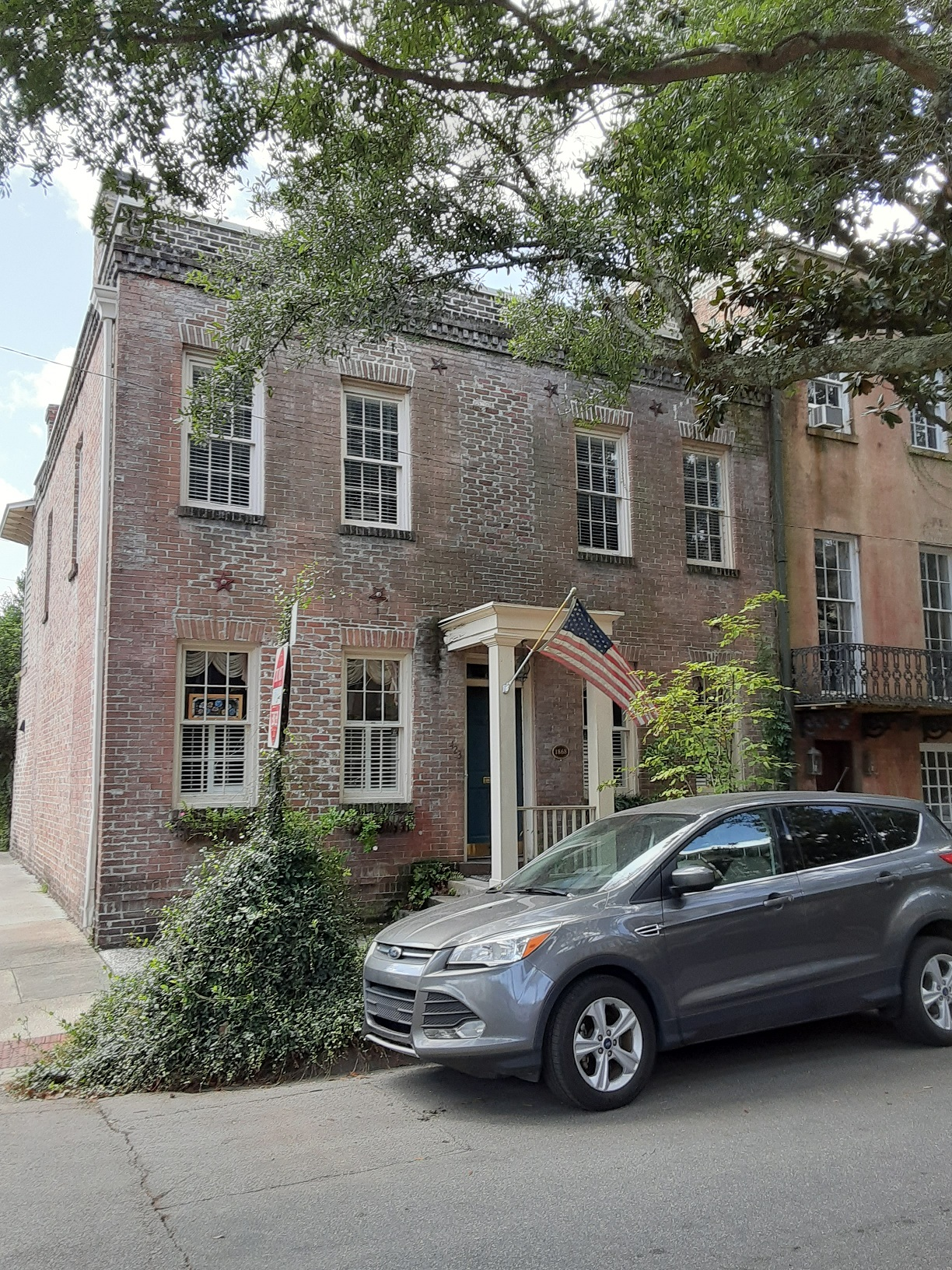
Ellen Williams House, 423 East Charlton Street

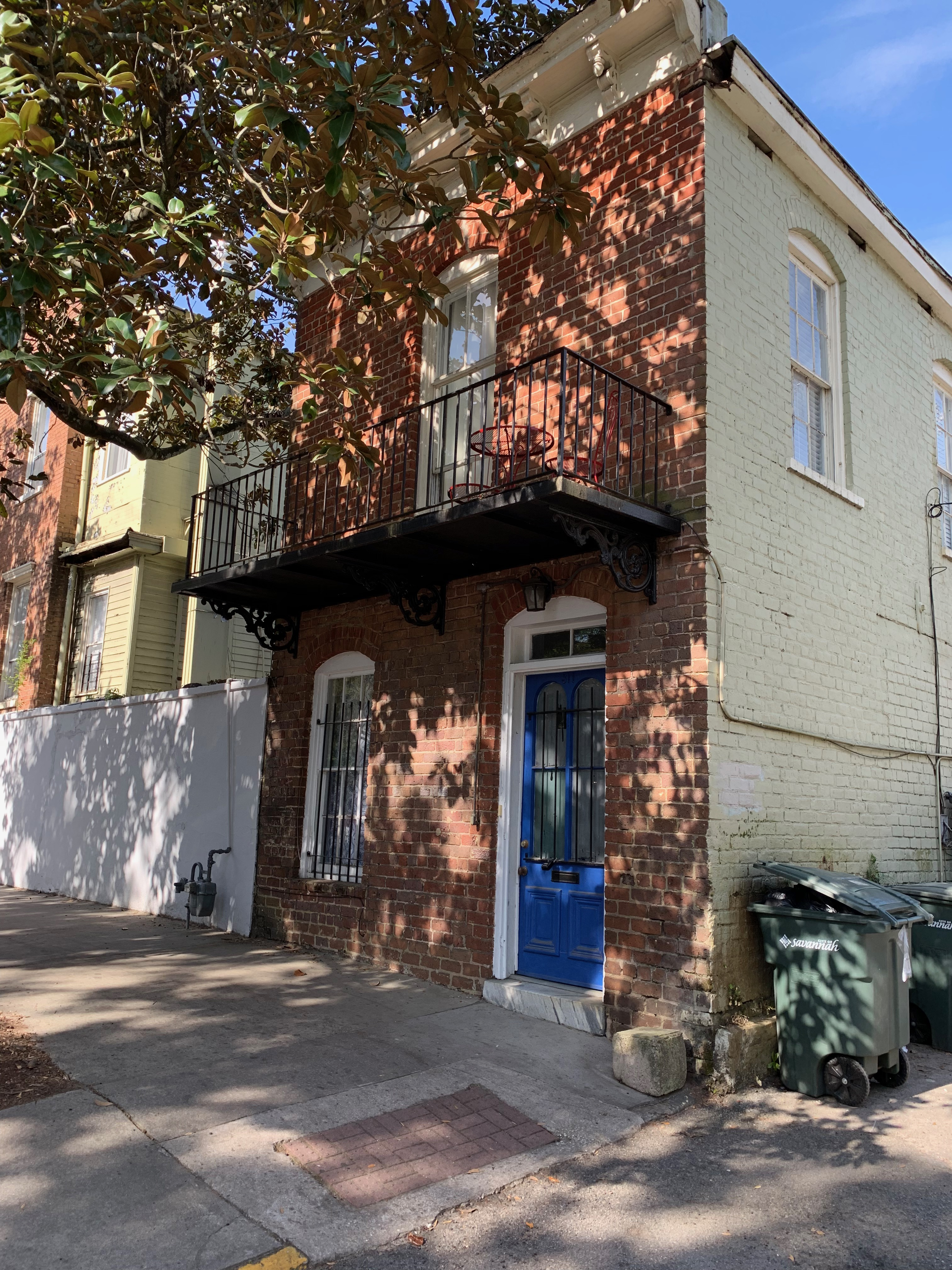
311 Habersham Street

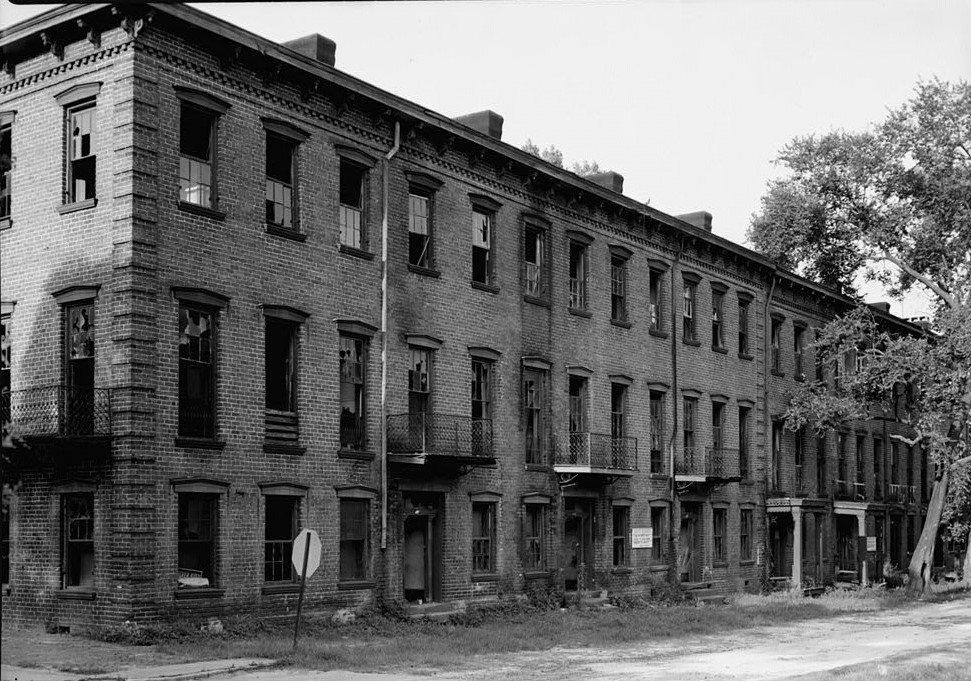
Troup Trust, 410–424 East Macon Street

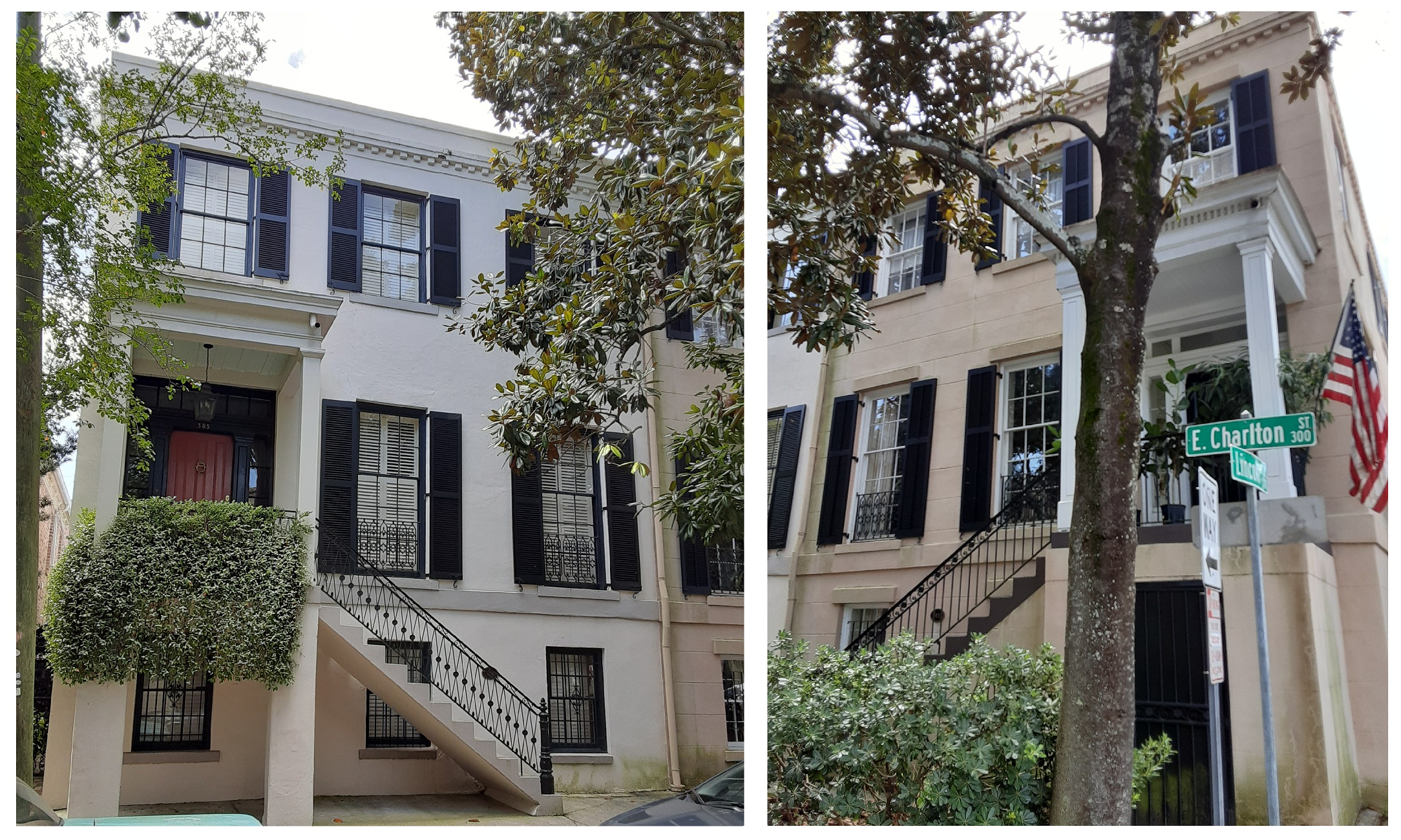
Charles Lampe Duplex, 301 & 305 East Charlton Street

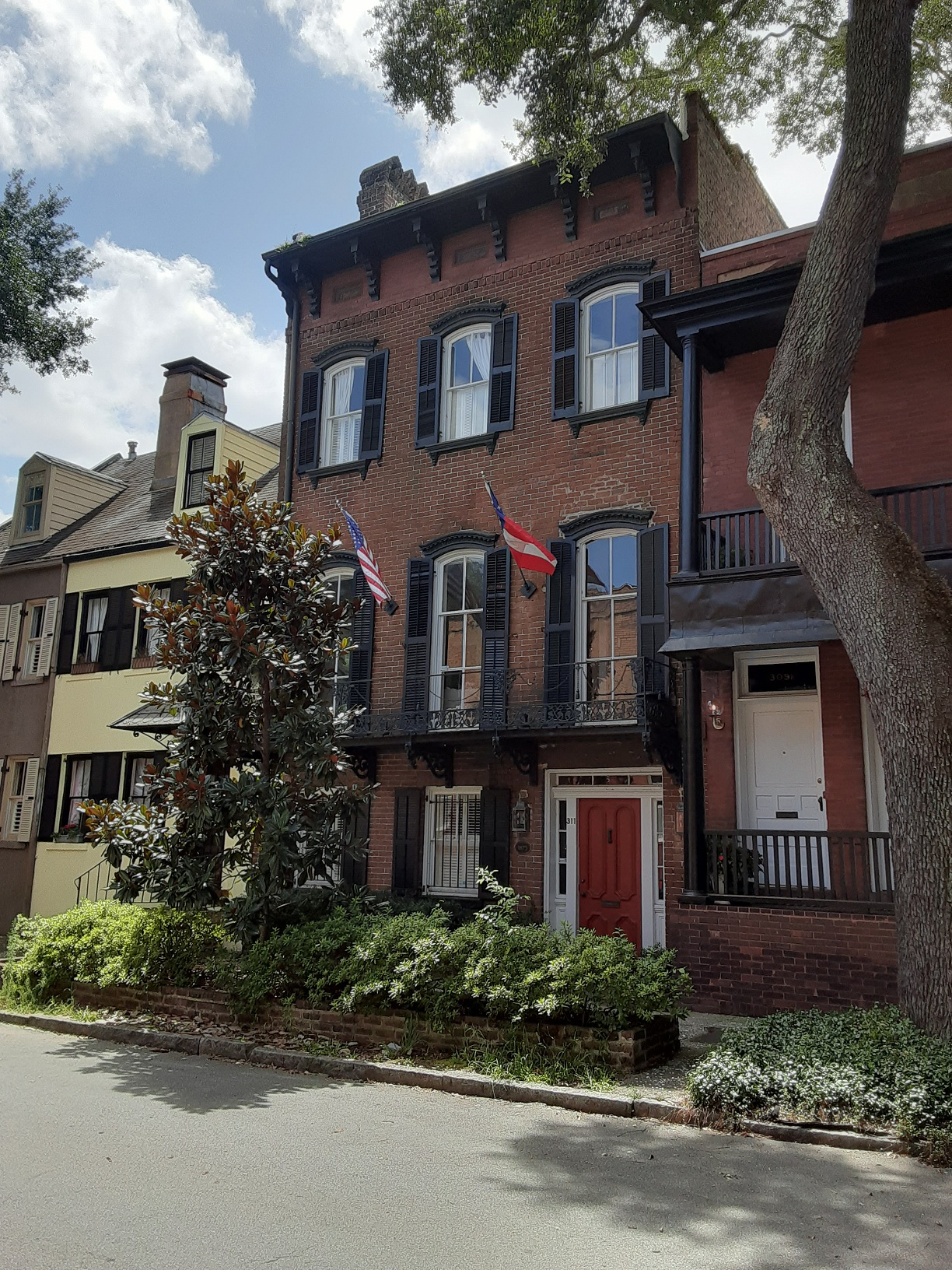
Mary Edmundson House, 311 East Charlton Street

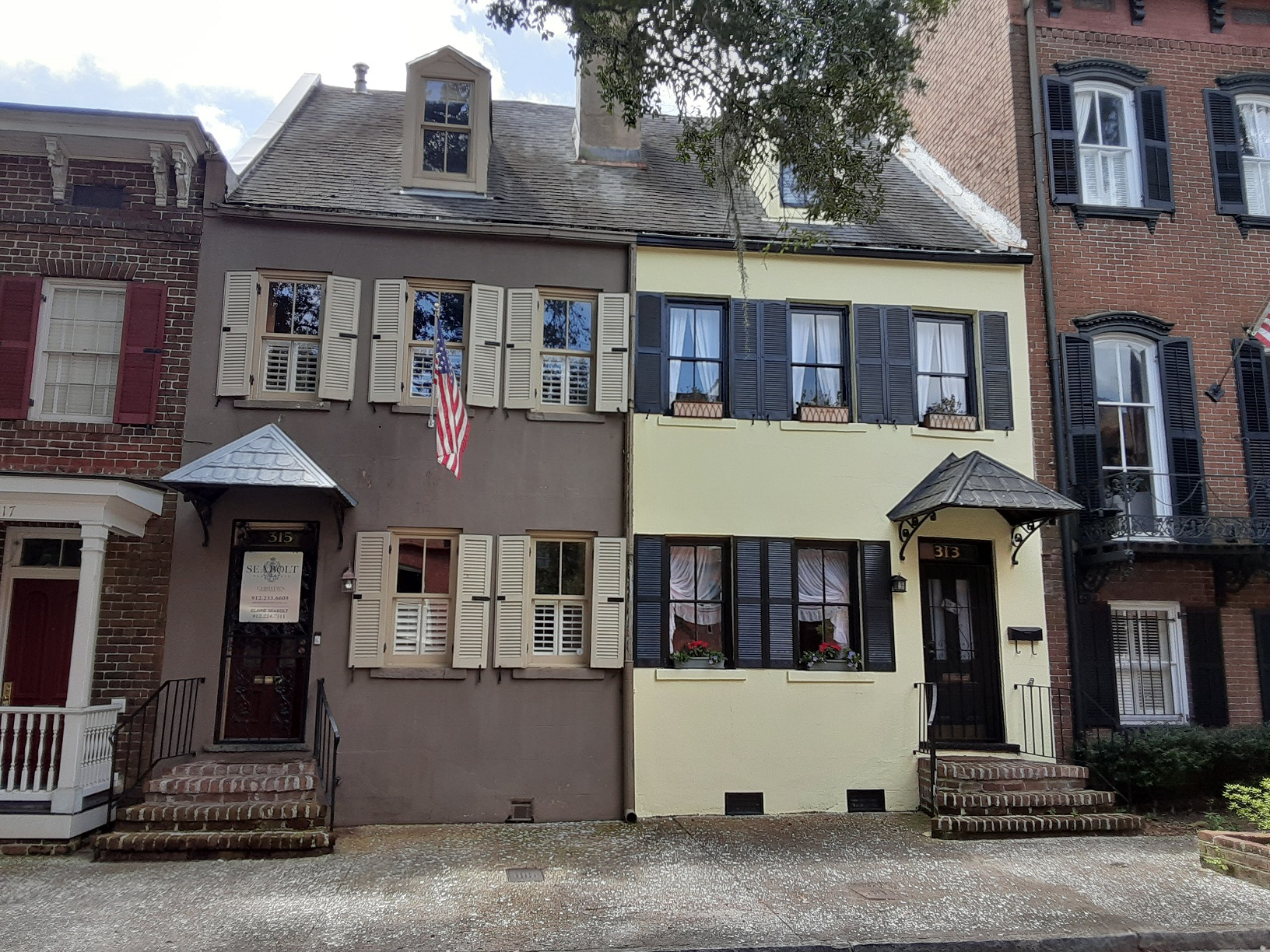
Lewis Cook Duplex, 313–315 East Charlton Street

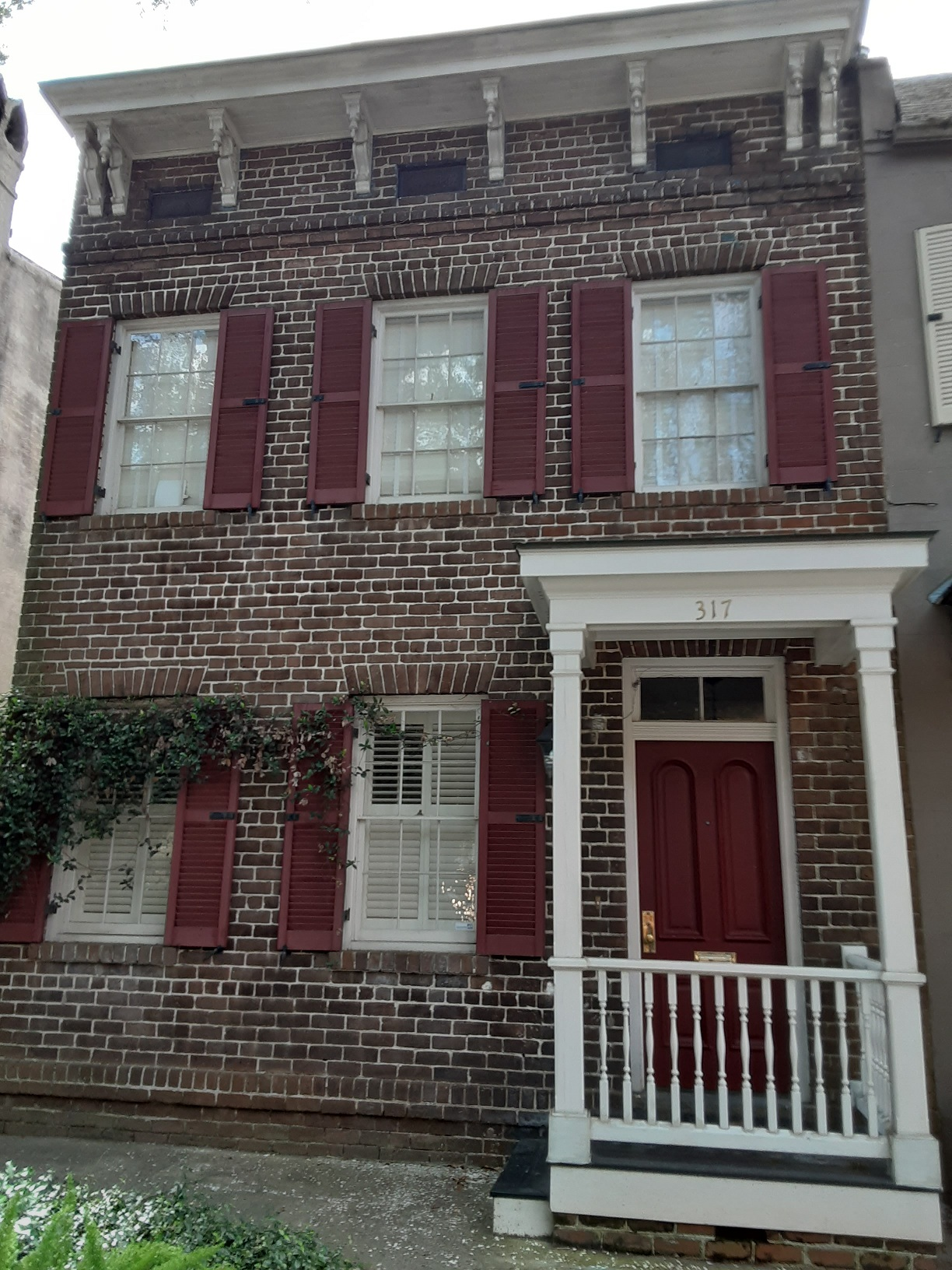
Michael McQuade House, 317 East Charlton Street

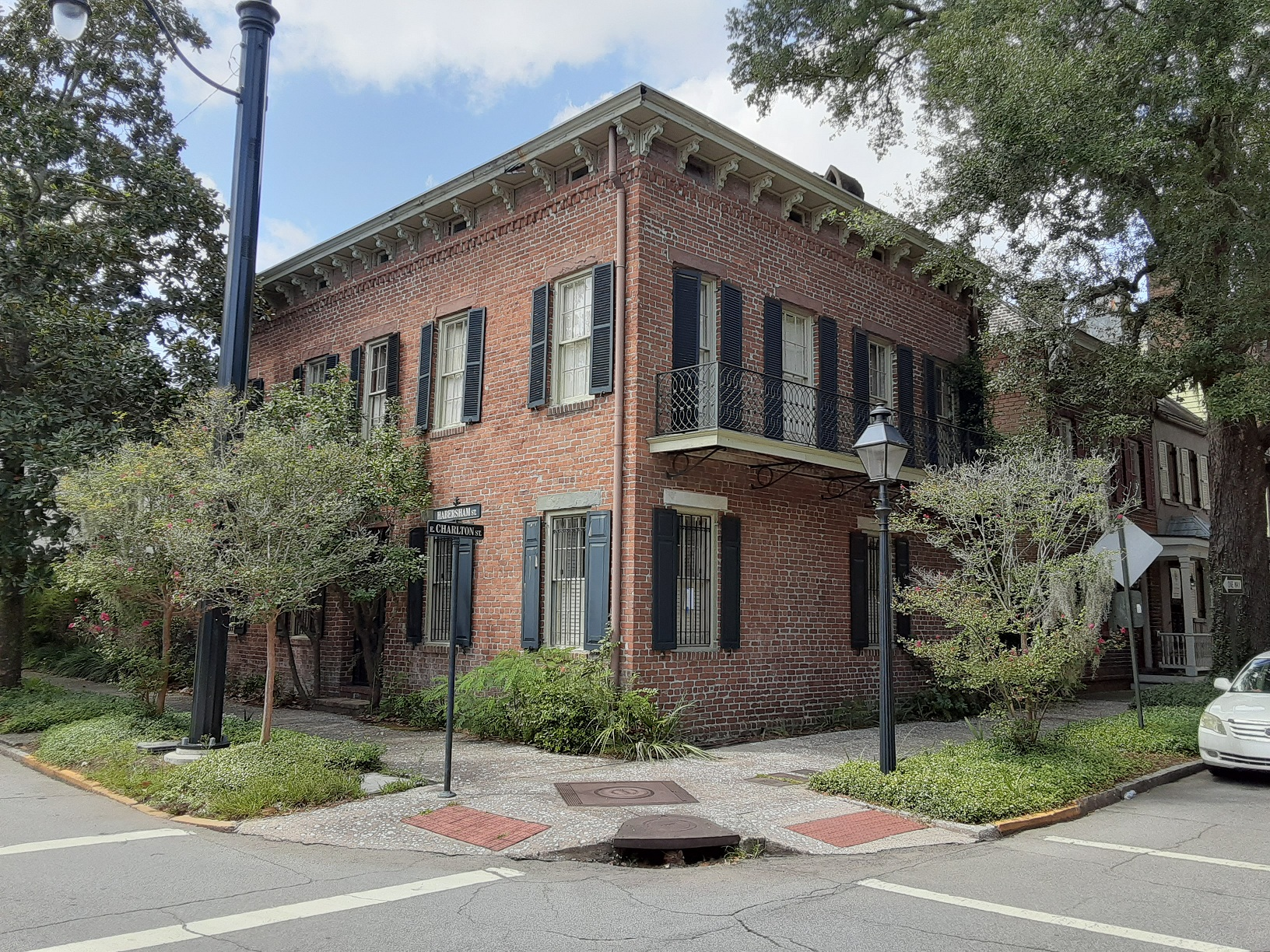
John Kenney House, 319 East Charlton Street
