= West Tisbury, Massachusetts =

- Town
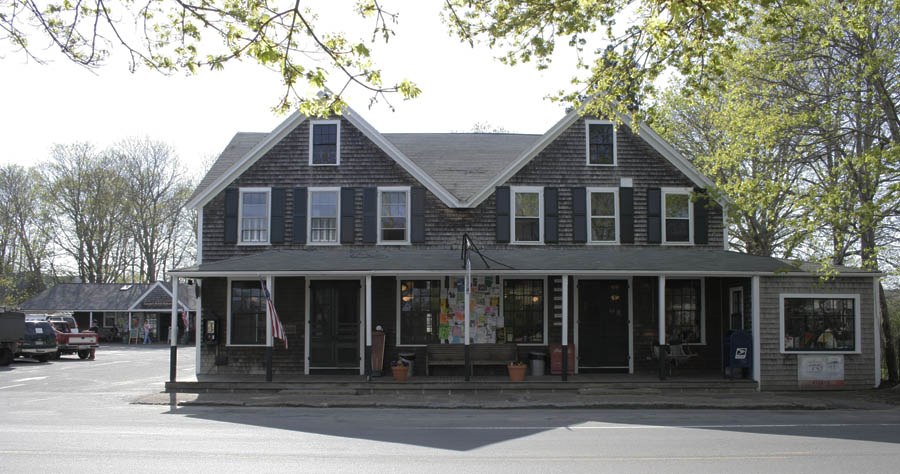
- Front of Alley's General Store

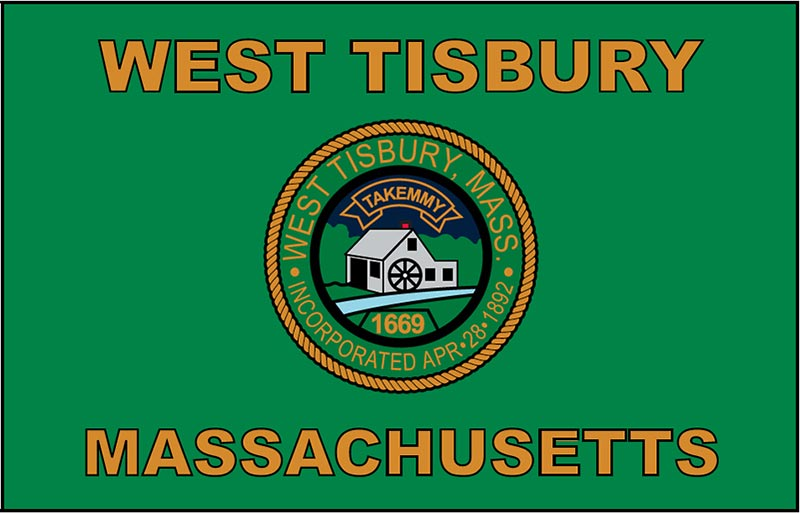
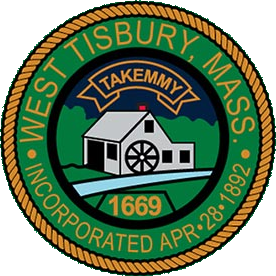
- Flag Seal

- Location in Dukes County in Massachusetts
- Coordinates: 41°22′52″N 70°40′30″W
- Country: United States
- State: Massachusetts
- County: Dukes
- Settled: 1669
- Incorporated: April 28, 1892

Government
  - Type: Open town meeting
  - Town Administrator: Jennifer Rand

Area
  - Total: 41.8 sq mi (108.2 km^{2})
  - Land: 25.0 sq mi (64.8 km^{2})
  - Water: 16.7 sq mi (43.3 km^{2})
- Elevation: 36 ft (11 m)

Population (2020)
  - Total: 3,555
  - Density: 142/sq mi (54.9/km^{2})
- Time zone: UTC−5 (Eastern)
  - Summer (DST): UTC−4 (Eastern)
- ZIP Codes: 02575 (West Tisbury); 02568 (Vineyard Haven)
- Area code: 508/774
- FIPS code: 25-78235
- GNIS feature ID: 0618291
- Website: www.westtisbury-ma.gov

West Tisbury is a town on Martha's Vineyard in Massachusetts. The population was 3,555 at the 2020 census. Along with Chilmark and Aquinnah, West Tisbury forms "Up-Island" Martha's Vineyard.

== History ==
West Tisbury was first settled by English settlers in 1669 as part of the town of Tisbury. The town was officially incorporated in 1892, the last town on Martha's Vineyard to be incorporated. Despite its separation from Tisbury, the original settlement of the town is still located in West Tisbury. Historically, it has been the agricultural heartland of the island. Up through the 1980s West Tisbury was one of the quickest growing communities on the island.

== Geography ==
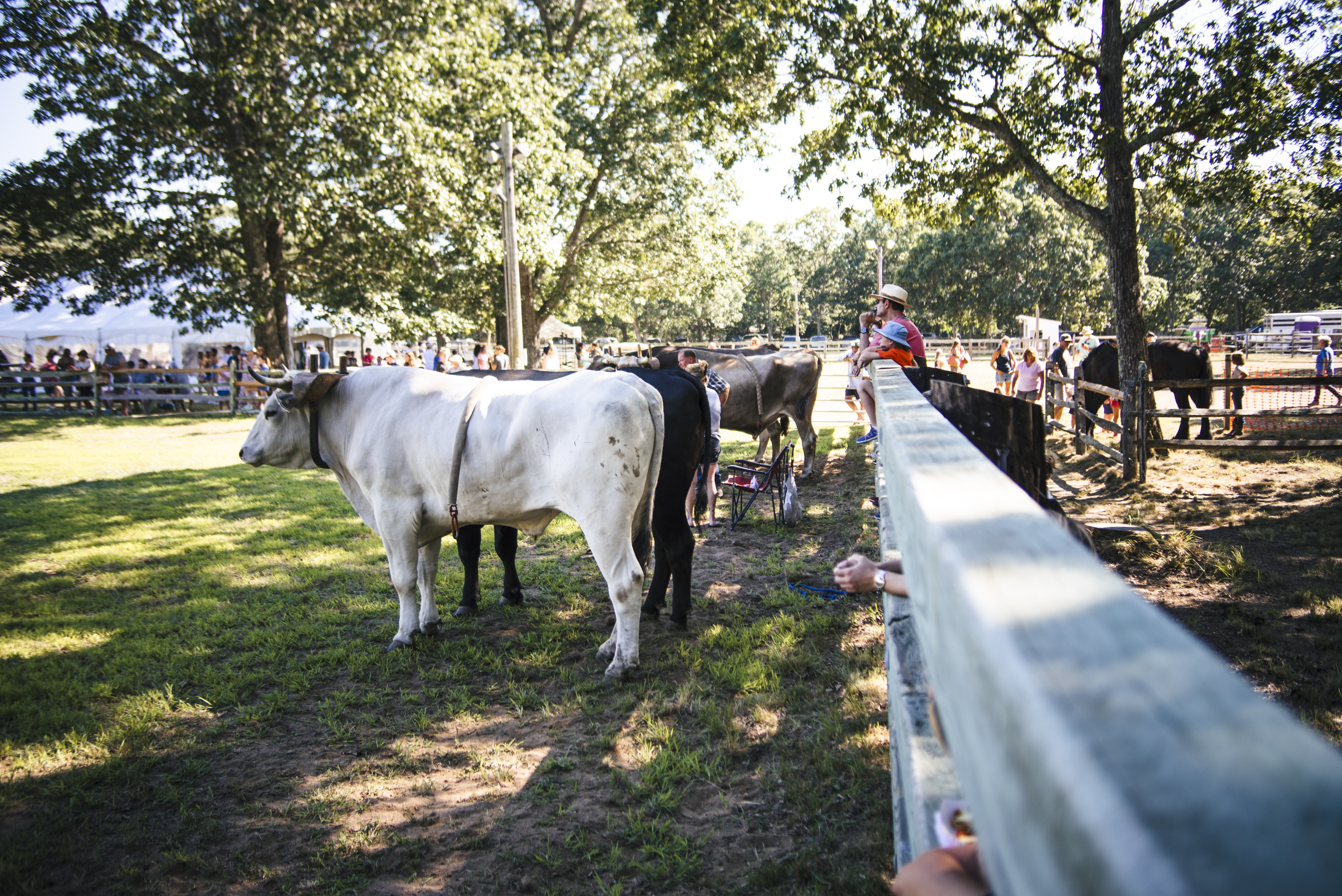
The annual agricultural fair held in West Tisbury.

According to the United States Census Bureau, the town has a total area of 41.8 square miles (108.2 km^{2}), of which 25.0 square miles (64.8 km^{2}) is land and 16.7 square miles (43.3 km^{2}), or 40.06%, is water. West Tisbury ranks 123rd out of 351 communities in the Commonwealth in terms of land area, and is the second largest town (behind Edgartown) on the Vineyard. West Tisbury is bordered by Vineyard Sound to the northwest, Tisbury to the northeast, Edgartown to the east, the Atlantic Ocean to the south, and Chilmark to the west, and includes the regions known as Lambert's Cove and Makonikey. The town also shares a common corner with Oak Bluffs, where the two towns meet with Tisbury and Edgartown.

West Tisbury is mostly rural, with more forestation to the north and east and most of the town's agrarian areas around the brooks that feed into Tisbury Great Pond and its surrounding ponds. The Sound side of town also has several ponds; none are nearly the size of the bodies of water on the Atlantic side. There are several refuges and reservations around town, the largest being the Long Point Wildlife Refuge just east of Tisbury Great Pond. The town is also home to approximately half of the Manuel F. Correllus State Forest, which dominates the center of the island.

Just south of the forest lies Martha's Vineyard Airport, which the town shares with Edgartown (although the facilities are mostly in West Tisbury). The airport provides regional service to airports on the mainland and at Nantucket.

== Demographics ==
Historical population
Year	Pop.	±%
1900	442	—
1910	437	−1.1%
1920	345	−21.1%
1930	270	−21.7%
1940	260	−3.7%
1950	347	+33.5%
1960	360	+3.7%
1970	453	+25.8%
1980	1,010	+123.0%
1990	1,704	+68.7%
2000	2,467	+44.8%
2010	2,740	+11.1%
2020	3,555	+29.7%
2023*	3,586	+0.9%
* = population estimate. Source: United States Census records and Population Estimates Program data.

As of the census of 2000, there were 2,467 people, 1,034 households, and 668 families residing in the town. The population density was 98.6 inhabitants per square mile (38.1/km^{2}). There were 1,849 housing units at an average density of 73.9 per square mile (28.5/km^{2}). The racial makeup of the town was 96.23% White, 0.69% African American, 0.20% Native American, 0.36% Asian, 0.28% Pacific Islander, 0.49% from other races, and 1.74% from two or more races. Hispanic or Latino of any race were 0.69% of the population.

There were 1,034 households, out of which 35.1% had children under the age of 18 living with them, 49.4% were married couples living together, 11.3% had a female householder with no husband present, and 35.3% were non-families. 26.9% of all households were made up of individuals, and 7.1% had someone living alone who was 65 years of age or older. The average household size was 2.38 and the average family size was 2.89.

In the town, the population was spread out, with 25.7% under the age of 18, 4.4% from 18 to 24, 27.4% from 25 to 44, 32.4% from 45 to 64, and 10.1% who were 65 years of age or older. The median age was 41 years. For every 100 females, there were 97.7 males. For every 100 females age 18 and over, there were 93.3 males.

The median income for a household in the town was $54,077, and the median income for a family was $59,514. Males had a median income of $42,813 versus $29,907 for females. The per capita income for the town was $31,021. About 1.6% of families and 2.4% of the population were below the poverty line, including 1.9% of those under age 18 and 1.2% of those age 65 or over.

West Tisbury ranks 281st in terms of population, and 282nd in terms of population density in the state. It has the fourth-largest population and population density on the island, and the smallest of the populations in the thousands. (Aquinnah and Chilmark's populations number in the hundreds, and Gosnold, at 86, is the smallest community in the Commonwealth.)

=== Ancestry/Ethnicity ===
The largest ancestry/ethnic groups in West Tisbury are:

- 30.4% English
- 13.6% Irish
- 9.7% German
- 7.1% Scottish
- 6.0% French
- 5.8% Portuguese
- 3.5% Italian
- 3.4% Norwegian
- 2.6% Polish
- 2.1% Russian

== Government ==
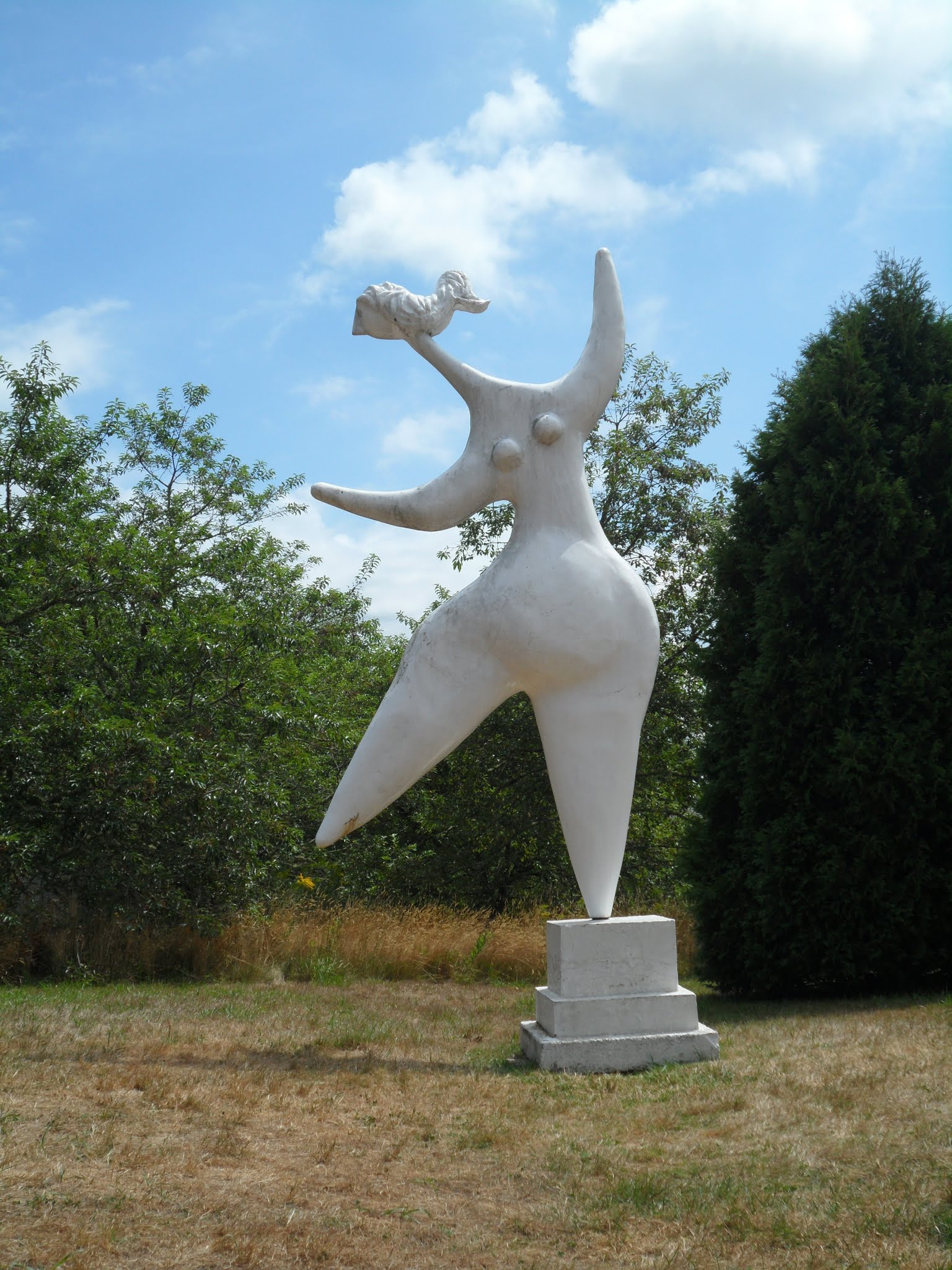
Dancing Female statue sculpture by Tom Maley (American, 1911–2000) founder The Field Gallery, Granary Gallery Family.

On the national level, West Tisbury is a part of Massachusetts's 9th congressional district, and is currently represented by William R. Keating. Massachusetts is currently represented in the United States Senate by junior Senator Ed Markey and senior senator Elizabeth Warren.

On the state level, West Tisbury is represented in the Massachusetts House of Representatives as a part of the Barnstable, Dukes and Nantucket district, which includes all of Martha's Vineyard and Nantucket, as well as a portion of Falmouth. The town is represented in the Massachusetts Senate as a portion of the Cape and Islands district, which includes all of Martha's Vineyard, Nantucket and most of Barnstable County (with the exception of Bourne, Sandwich, Falmouth and a portion of Barnstable. All of Dukes County is patrolled by the Fifth (Oak Bluffs) Barracks of Troop D of the Massachusetts State Police.

West Tisbury is governed on the local level by the open town meeting form of government, and is led by a board of selectmen. The police station is located in the North Tisbury business district, co-located with the Fire Department's Station II, and the town has two fire stations; located farther up Edgartown-West Tisbury Road and near the business district. The post office is located north of North Tisbury, and the West Tisbury Free Public Library is located just north of the town center.

== Education ==
West Tisbury is part of the Martha's Vineyard Regional School District along with Aquinnah, Chilmark, Edgartown, Oak Bluffs, and Tisbury. Students in West Tisbury attend West Tisbury Elementary School, from grades K–8.

The Up-Island School District (West Tisbury School) has a "school choice" program which was renewed in 2022.

High School students then attend Martha's Vineyard Regional High School.

Also located in West Tisbury is the Martha's Vineyard Charter School, a substitute school for anyone in K–12. It is located next to the WTFD building.

== Notable people ==
- John Belushi (1949-1982), comedian and actor
- Michael Craughwell, sword maker and star of the Discovery Channel series Big Giant Swords
- Nancy Luce, poet, folk artist
- Willy Mason, musician
- David McCullough, historian
- Ryen Russillo, The Ringer/NBA commentator

== Points of interest ==
- Polly Hill Arboretum
- Grange Hall
- Alley's General Store
- Waskosim's Rock
- Split Rock
- Old Mill
- The Mill Pond
- Field Gallery

== Popular culture ==
In The X-Files television show, Fox Mulder's father lives in West Tisbury.
