= Martha's Vineyard (disambiguation) =

Martha's Vineyard is an island within the U.S. state of Massachusetts.

Martha's Vineyard may also refer to:

== Transport ==
- Martha's Vineyard (steamboat), 19th century steamer ferry that served the island of Martha's Vineyard
- Martha's Vineyard Airport, public airport on the island of Martha's Vineyard
- Martha's Vineyard Railroad, former railroad on the island of Martha's Vineyard

== Media ==
- The Martha's Vineyard Times, weekly newspaper published on the island of Martha's Vineyard
- Martha's Vineyard Magazine, regional magazine covering Martha's Vineyard island
- Martha's Vineyard International Film Festival, film festival on the island of Martha's Vineyard

== Viticulture ==
- Martha's Vineyard AVA, viticultural area on the islands of Martha's Vineyard and Chappaquiddick Island
- A vineyard in Oakville, California growing grapes used by Heitz Wine Cellars

== Other uses ==
- Martha's Vineyard (band), Australian rock band
- Martha's Vineyard Campground, a National Historic Landmark District on the island of Martha's Vineyard
- Martha's Vineyard Hospital, a not-for-profit regional medical center in Oak Bluffs, Massachusetts
- Martha's Vineyard Regional High School, on the island of Martha's Vineyard
- Martha's Vineyard Sharks, collegiate summer baseball team based on Martha's Vineyard
- Martha's Vineyard Sign Language, a sign language once widely used on the island of Martha's Vineyard
