= Martha's Vineyard =

Island in Massachusetts, US

Native name: Noepe Nickname: The Vineyard, The Rock
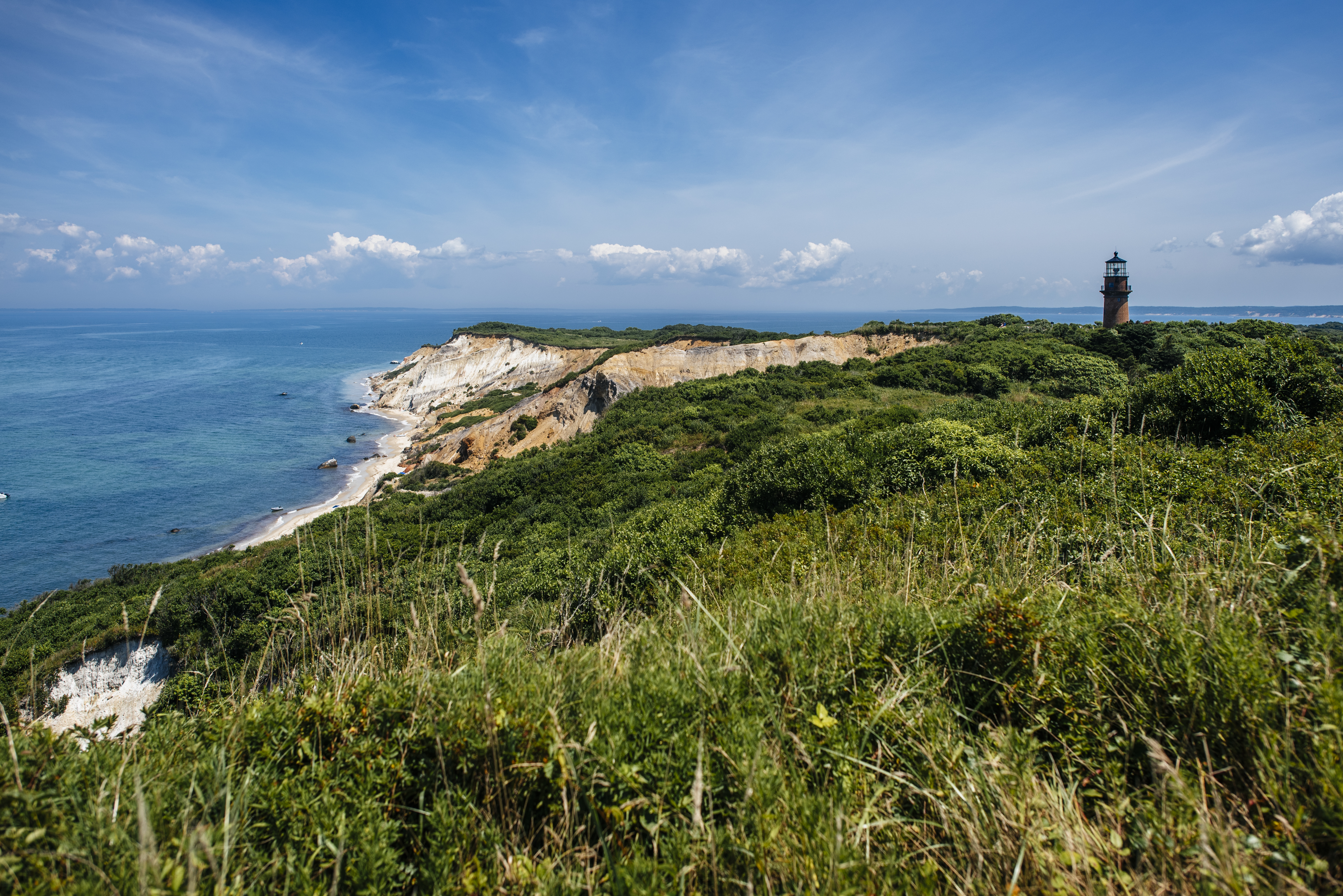
- Gay Head Cliffs and Lighthouse, Aquinnah
- Interactive map of Martha's Vineyard

Geography
- Location: Dukes County, Massachusetts
- Coordinates: 41°24′N 70°37′W
- Major islands: Martha's Vineyard, Chappaquiddick
- Area: 96 sq mi (250 km^{2})
- Length: 20.5 mi (33 km)
- Coastline: 200 km (124 mi)
- Highest elevation: 311 ft (94.8 m)
- Highest point: Peaked Hill

Administration
- United States
- State: Massachusetts
- County: Dukes

Demographics
- Population: 20,530 (2023)
- Pop. density: 179.8/sq mi (69.42/km^{2})

Martha's Vineyard (Wampanoag: Noepe), often simply called the Vineyard, is an island in Massachusetts, lying just south of Cape Cod. It is known for being a popular, affluent summer colony and includes the peninsula Chappaquiddick Island. It is the 58th largest island in the U.S., and the ninth largest in the contiguous United States, with a land area of about 96 square miles (250 km^{2}), and the third-largest on the East Coast, after Long Island and Mount Desert Island. Martha's Vineyard constitutes the bulk of Dukes County, Massachusetts, which also includes the Elizabeth Islands and the island of Nomans Land.

The island's year-round population has considerably increased since the 1960s. In the 2023 Martha's Vineyard Commission report, the year-round population was 20,530, an increase from 16,460 in 2010. The summer population swells to more than 200,000 people. About 56 percent of the Vineyard's 14,621 homes are seasonally occupied.

Though many have suggested that the island was renamed after English explorer Bartholomew Gosnold's daughter Martha, it is more likely that both the island and his daughter were namesakes of his wealthy mother-in-law, Martha (Judde) Golding, who partly funded his expedition in 1602 – the first recorded European expedition to Cape Cod. (Note: Gosnold's daughter was christened in St. James' Church (now St. Edmundsbury Cathedral), Bury St. Edmunds in Suffolk, England and is buried in the Great Churchyard that lies in front of the Abbey ruins between St. Mary's Church and the Cathedral.) A smaller island to the south was first to be named "Martha's Vineyard" but the name later became associated with this island. It is the eighth-oldest surviving English place-name in the United States. The island was subsequently known as Martin's Vineyard (possibly after a captain in the exploratory party, John Martin); many people and maps up to the 18th century called it by this name.

When the United States Board on Geographic Names worked to standardize placename spellings in the late 19th century, apostrophes were dropped. Thus for a time Martha's Vineyard was officially named Marthas Vineyard, but the Board reversed its decision in the early 20th century, making Martha's Vineyard one of the five placenames in the United States that takes a possessive apostrophe. (Note: The others are Carlos Elmer's Joshua View, Arizona; Clark's Mountain, Oregon; Ike's Point, New Jersey; and John E's Pond, Rhode Island.)

According to historian Henry Franklin Norton, the island was known by Native Americans as Noepe or Capawock. It is referred to in the 1691 Massachusetts Charter (which transferred the island from the Province of New York during the breakup of the Dominion of New England) as Cappawock.

== History ==
=== Pre-European settlement ===
The island was originally inhabited by Wampanoag people, when Martha's Vineyard was known in the Massachusett language as Noepe, or 'land amid the streams'. In 1642, the Wampanoag numbered somewhere around 3,000 on the island. By 1764, that number had dropped to 313.

=== Colonial era ===
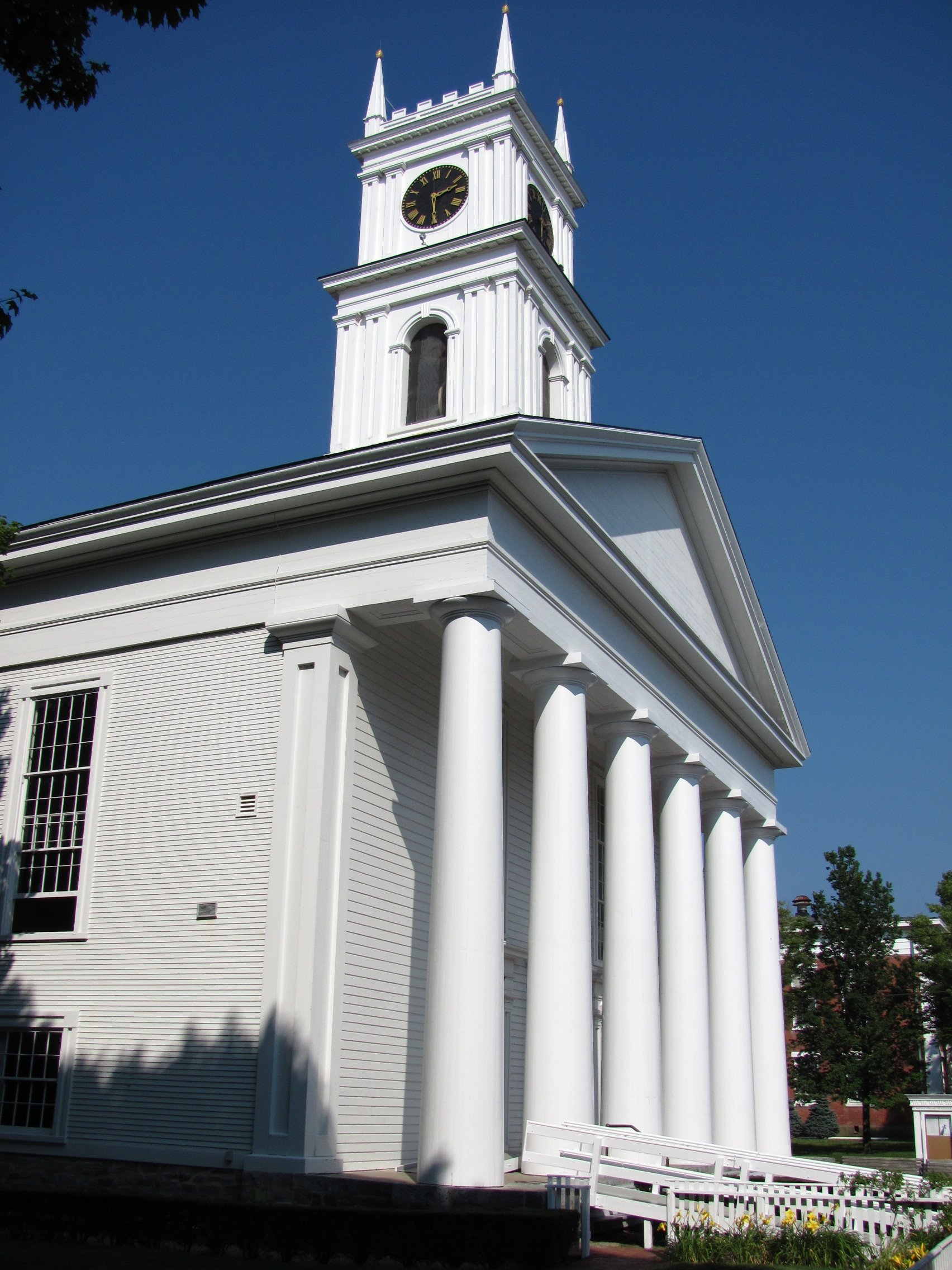
Old Whaling Church, Edgartown Village Historic District

European settlement began with the purchase of Martha's Vineyard, Nantucket, and the Elizabeth Islands by Thomas Mayhew of Watertown, Massachusetts, from two New England settlers. He had friendly relations with the Wampanoags on the island, in part because he was careful to honor their land rights. His son, also named Thomas Mayhew, established the first settlement on the island in 1642 at Great Harbor (later Edgartown, Massachusetts).

The younger Mayhew began a relationship with Hiacoomes, a Native American neighbor, which eventually led to Hiacoomes' family converting to Christianity. During King Philip's War later in the century, the Martha's Vineyard band did not join their tribal relatives in the uprising and remained armed, a testimony to the good relations cultivated by the Mayhews as the leaders of the colony. In 1657, the younger Mayhew was drowned when a ship he was travelling in was lost at sea on a voyage to England. Mayhew's grandsons Matthew Mayhew, John Mayhew, and other members of his family assisted him in running his business and government. In 1665, Mayhew's lands were included in a grant to the Duke of York. In 1671, a settlement was arranged which allowed Mayhew to continue in his position while placing his territory under the jurisdiction of the Province of New York.

==== Attempted annexation by Rhode Island (1684) ====
In 1682, Matthew Mayhew succeeded his grandfather as governor and chief magistrate, and occasionally preached to the Native Americans. He was also appointed judge of the Court of Common Pleas for Dukes County in 1697 and remained on the bench until 1700. He was judge of probate from 1696 to 1710. In 1683, Dukes County was incorporated, including Martha's Vineyard. In 1691, at the collapse of rule by Sir Edmund Andros and the reorganization of Massachusetts as a royal colony, Dukes County was transferred to the Province of Massachusetts Bay and split into Dukes County, Massachusetts and Nantucket County. Following the revocation of the Massachusetts Bay Colony Charter in 1684, William Coddington Jr., who was governor of Rhode Island at the time, attempted to seize Martha's Vineyard through a group of militia as "reparations for former damages of past leaders made by the settlers," most likely referring to the Puritan actions on Rhode Island leaders Roger Williams and Anne Hutchinson, as well as annex threats made by Massachusetts. It is possible that Coddington only wanted to annex Martha's Vineyard due to its proximity to Rhode Island and the fact that it would have taken more labor for colonists in Massachusetts to reach Martha's Vineyard before Rhode Island could obtain full control of the island. The plan flopped: Rhode Island militiamen were deployed in a group of three boats and "upon seeing men on Martha's Vineyard, the men immediately fled the vicinity of the island and returned home after The Governor dispatched them from their duties and made the plan defunct". There is debate as to who told leaders from Massachusetts about the plan. One story has prevailed, that a traveler going to and from Rhode Island and Massachusetts for business purposes heard the claim and reported it back to officials in Massachusetts. Massachusetts, specifically Martha's Vineyard, was not intimidated by this attempt and thought Rhode Island to be weaker because of their immediate retreat.

As for the history following the attempted annexation, Native American literacy in the schools founded by Thomas Mayhew Jr. and taught by Peter Folger (the grandfather of Benjamin Franklin) was such that the first Native American graduates of Harvard were from Martha's Vineyard, including the son of Hiacoomes, Joel Hiacoomes. Caleb Cheeshahteaumuck, another Native American resident of Martha's Vineyard, graduated from Harvard in 1665. Cheeshahteaumauk's Latin address to the corporation (New England Corporation), which begins "Honoratissimi benefactores" (most honored benefactors), has been preserved. In addition to speaking Wampanoag and English, they studied Hebrew, classical Greek, and Latin. All of the early Native American graduates died shortly after completing their course of study. Many native preachers on the island also preached in the Christian churches from time to time.

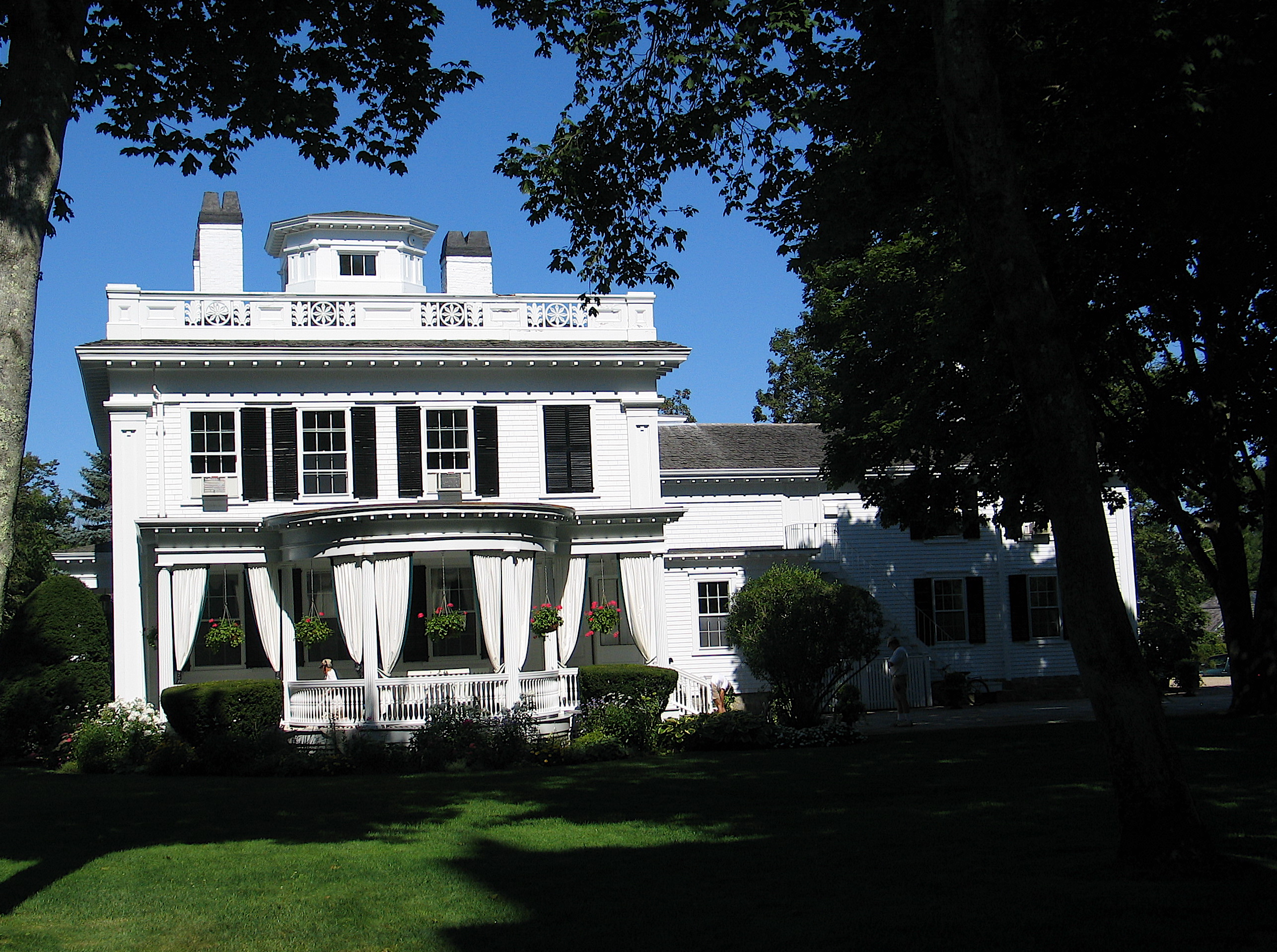
Historic house next to the Whaling Church

Mayhew's successor as leader of the community was Leavitt Thaxter, who married Martha Mayhew, a descendant of Thomas Mayhew, and was an Edgartown educator described by Indian Commissioner John Milton Earle as "a long and steadfast friend to the Indians." After living in Northampton, Thaxter, a lawyer, returned home to Edgartown, where he took over the school founded by his father, Rev. Joseph Thaxter, and served in the State House and the Senate, was a member of the Massachusetts Governor's Council, and later served as U. S. Customs Collector for Martha's Vineyard. Having rechristened his father's Edgartown school Thaxter Academy, on February 15, 1845, Thaxter was granted the sum of $50 per year for "the support of William Johnson, an Indian of the Chappequiddic tribe." By this time, Leavitt Thaxter had taken on the role, described in an act passed by the General Court of Massachusetts, as "guardian of the Indians and people of color resident at Chappequiddic and Indiantown in the County of Dukes County." Thaxter Academy became known for educating both white and Native American youth.

=== 19th century ===
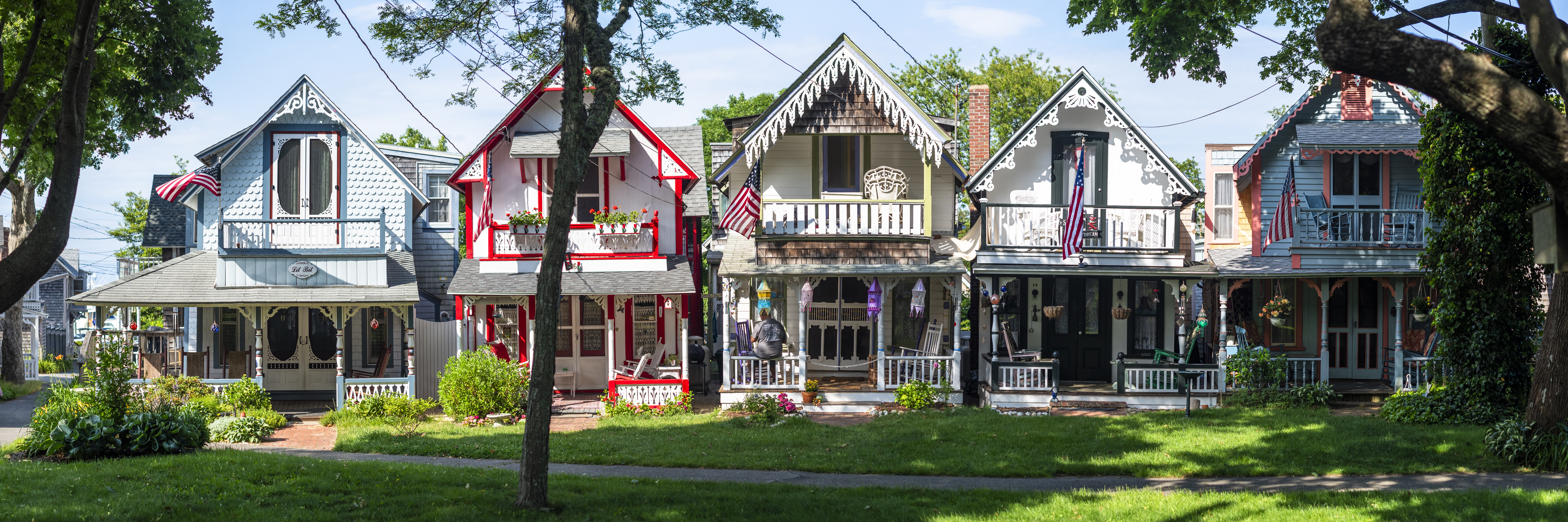
Gingerbread cottages at Wesleyan Grove, Oak Bluffs

Like the nearby island of Nantucket, Martha's Vineyard was brought to prominence in the 19th century by the whaling industry, during which ships were sent around the world to hunt whales for their oil and blubber. The discovery of petroleum in Pennsylvania gave rise to a cheaper source of oil for lamps and led to an almost complete collapse of the industry by 1870. After the Old Colony railroad came to Woods Hole in 1872, summer residences began to develop on the island, such as the community of Harthaven established by William H. Hart, the community of Ocean Heights, developed near Sengekontacket Pond in Edgartown by the prominent island businessman, Robert Marsden Laidlaw. Although the island struggled financially through the Great Depression, its reputation as a resort for tourists and the wealthy continued to grow. There is still a substantial Wampanoag population on the Vineyard, mainly located in the town of Aquinnah.

The island was the last refuge of the heath hen, an extinct subspecies of the greater prairie chicken, which was a once common game bird throughout the Northeastern United States. Despite 19th century efforts to protect the hen, by 1927 the population of birds had dropped to 13. The last known heath hen, named "Booming Ben", perished on Martha's Vineyard in 1932.

=== Modern era ===
Martha's Vineyard was used by the Army, Navy and Air Force from 1941 through 1945 for training missions that ranged from landings on beaches to climbing cliffs and bombing practice. Linguist William Labov wrote his master's thesis on changes in the Martha's Vineyard dialect of English. The 1963 study is widely recognized as a seminal work in the foundation of sociolinguistics.

Dike Bridge, Chappaquiddick

The island received international notoriety after the "Chappaquiddick incident" of July 18, 1969, in which Mary Jo Kopechne was killed in a car driven off the Dike Bridge by U.S. Senator Edward "Ted" Kennedy. The bridge crossed Poucha Pond on Chappaquiddick Island. The bridge was intended for people on foot and bicycles, as well as the occasional emergency vehicle when conditions warranted. Currently, 4×4 vehicles with passes are allowed to cross the reconstructed bridge.

On November 23, 1970, in the Atlantic Ocean just west of Aquinnah, Simas Kudirka, a Soviet seaman of Lithuanian nationality, attempted to defect to the United States by leaping onto a United States Coast Guard cutter from a Soviet fishing trawler and asking for asylum. The Coast Guard allowed a detachment of four seamen from the Soviet ship to board the cutter and "drag the kicking, screaming Kudirka back to their vessel." He was sentenced to 10 years of hard labor in the Soviet Union.

In 1974, Steven Spielberg filmed the movie Jaws on Martha's Vineyard, most notably in Menemsha and Chilmark. Spielberg selected island natives Christopher Rebello as Chief Brody's oldest son, Michael Brody; Jay Mello as the younger son, Sean Brody; and Lee Fierro as Mrs. Kintner. Scores of other island natives appear in the film as extras. Scenes from Jaws 2 and Jaws: The Revenge were filmed on the island. In June 2005 the island celebrated the 30th anniversary of Jaws with a weekend-long Jawsfest.

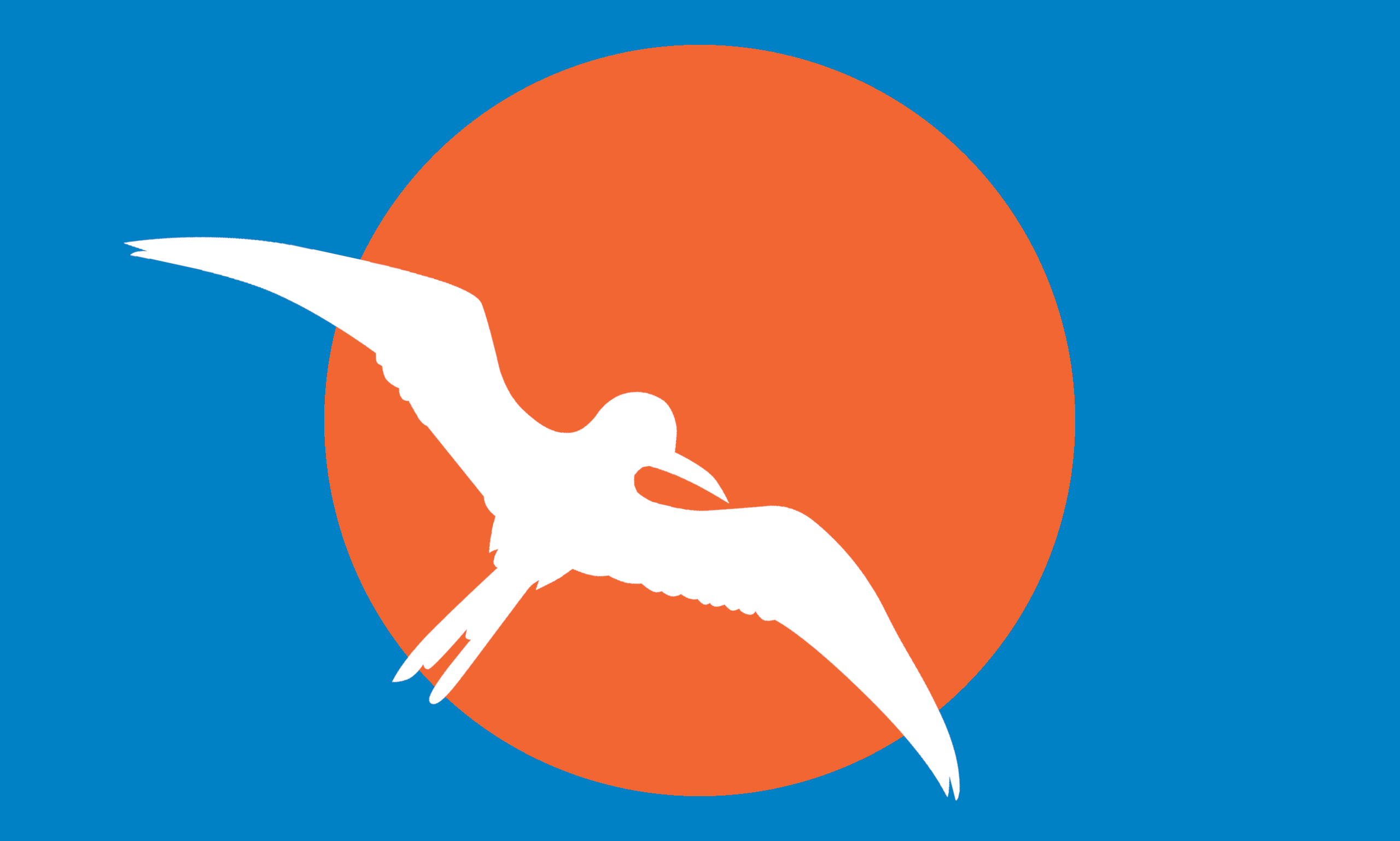
Martha's Vineyard secession flag

In 1977, distressed over losing their guaranteed seat in the Massachusetts General Court, inhabitants of Martha's Vineyard considered the possibility of secession from the Commonwealth of Massachusetts, either to become part of another state (having received offers from both Vermont and Hawaii), reincorporating as a separate U.S. territory, or as the nation's 51st state. The separatist flag, consisting of a white seagull over an orange disk on a sky-blue background, is still seen on the island today. Although the idea of separation from Massachusetts eventually proved impracticable, it did receive attention in the local, regional, and even national media.

On March 5, 1982, John Belushi died of a drug overdose in Los Angeles, California, and was buried four days later in Abel's Hill Cemetery in Chilmark. Belushi often visited the Vineyard, and his family felt it fitting to bury him there. On his gravestone is the quote: "Though I may be gone, Rock 'N' Roll lives on." Because of the many visitors to his grave and the threat of vandalism, his body was moved somewhere near the grave site. His grave remains a popular site for visitors to Chilmark, and they often leave tokens in memory of the late comedian.

Since the 1990s, Bill Clinton has spent regular vacation time on the island during and after his presidency, along with his wife Hillary Clinton and their daughter Chelsea. Clinton was not the first president to visit the islands; Ulysses S. Grant visited the vacation residence of his friend Bishop Gilbert Haven on August 24, 1874. Haven's gingerbread cottage was located in Oak Bluffs at 10 Clinton Avenue. The avenue was named in 1851 and was designated as the main promenade of the Martha's Vineyard Campmeeting Association campgrounds. In December 2019, President Barack Obama completed the purchase of a 30-acre (12 ha) homestead on the Edgartown Great Pond.

On July 16, 1999, a small plane crashed off the coast of Martha's Vineyard, claiming the lives of pilot John F. Kennedy Jr., his wife Carolyn Bessette, and her sister Lauren Bessette. Kennedy's mother, former U.S. first lady Jacqueline Kennedy Onassis, maintained a home in Aquinnah until her death in 1994.

In the summer of 2000, an outbreak of tularemia, also known as rabbit fever, resulted in one death and piqued the interest of the CDC, which wanted to test the island as a potential investigative ground for aerosolized Francisella tularensis. Over the following summers, Martha's Vineyard was identified as the only place in the world where documented cases of tularemia resulted from lawn mowing.

In September 2022, Florida Governor Ron DeSantis flew two planeloads of Venezuelan migrants to Martha's Vineyard in an effort to draw attention to what Republican governors consider "the Biden administration's failed border policies". Some observers criticized DeSantis because the migrants were flown there unannounced. For nearly two days, island residents provided clothing, food, toys, toiletries, and temporary shelter, before removing the migrants from the island.

=== African American history ===
People were bought, sold, and probated as property on Martha's Vineyard. In 1700, Reverend Samuel Sewall, a seasonal resident of Martha's Vineyard, was one of the first to publicly oppose slavery in the New England Colonies. In 1646, magistrates in Massachusetts ruled that two Africans who had been enslaved and imported be returned to their native country. In 1652, Rhode Island passed a law abolishing slavery and ordering that Africans be freed after a term of 10 years, just like indentured servants. In addition to that, "at no time during its history did people of color lose the right to use the courts to challenge their status. Nor did they lose the right to inherit property in certain circumstances."

On October 15, 2020, Edgartown Harbor was officially recognized as an Underground Railroad Site by the National Park Service. This recognition was given after a submission from a nonprofit corporation, the African American Heritage Trail of Martha's Vineyard. The corporation was founded in 1998 by Martha's Vineyard NAACP vice president Carrie Camillo Tankard and teacher Elaine Cawley Weintraub. Their mission is to "continue to research and publish previously undocumented history and to involve the Island community in the identification and celebration of the contributions made by people of color to the island of Martha's Vineyard." The trail consists of 31 sites all marked by a descriptive plaque.

=== Hereditary deafness and sign language ===
Martha's Vineyard became known as an "everyone signs" community after three centuries of an unusually high level of hereditary deafness caused Martha's Vineyard to be labeled a "deaf utopia". Its deaf heritage cannot be traced to one common ancestor and is thought to have originated in the Weald, a region that overlaps the borders of the English counties of Kent and Sussex, prior to immigration. Researcher Nora Groce estimates that by the late 19th century, one in 155 people on the Vineyard was born deaf (0.7 percent)—about 37 times the estimate for the nation at large (1 in 5,728, or 0.02 percent)—because of a "recessive pattern" of genetic deafness, circulated through endogamous marriage patterns.

Deaf Vineyarders generally earned an average or above-average income (proved by tax records), and they participated in church affairs with passion. The deafness on the island affected both females and males in approximately the same percentage. In the late 19th century, the mixed marriages between deaf and hearing spouses comprised 65 percent of all deaf marriages on the island, as compared to the rate of 20 percent deaf-hearing marriage in the mainland. The sign language used by Vineyarders is called Martha's Vineyard Sign Language (MVSL), and it is different from American Sign Language (ASL). However, the geographical, time, and population proximities state that MVSL and ASL are impossible to develop in complete isolation from each other. MVSL was commonly used by hearing residents as well as deaf ones until the middle of the 20th century. No language barrier created a smooth communication environment for all the residents of the island.

In the 20th century, tourism became a mainstay in the island economy, and tourism-related jobs appeared. However, jobs in tourism were not as deaf-friendly as fishing and farming had been. Consequently, as intermarriage and further migration joined the people of Martha's Vineyard to the mainland, the island community more and more resembled the oral community there. The last deaf person born into the island's sign-language tradition, Katie West, died in 1952, but a few elderly residents were able to recall MVSL as recently as the 1980s when research into the language began.

== Climate ==
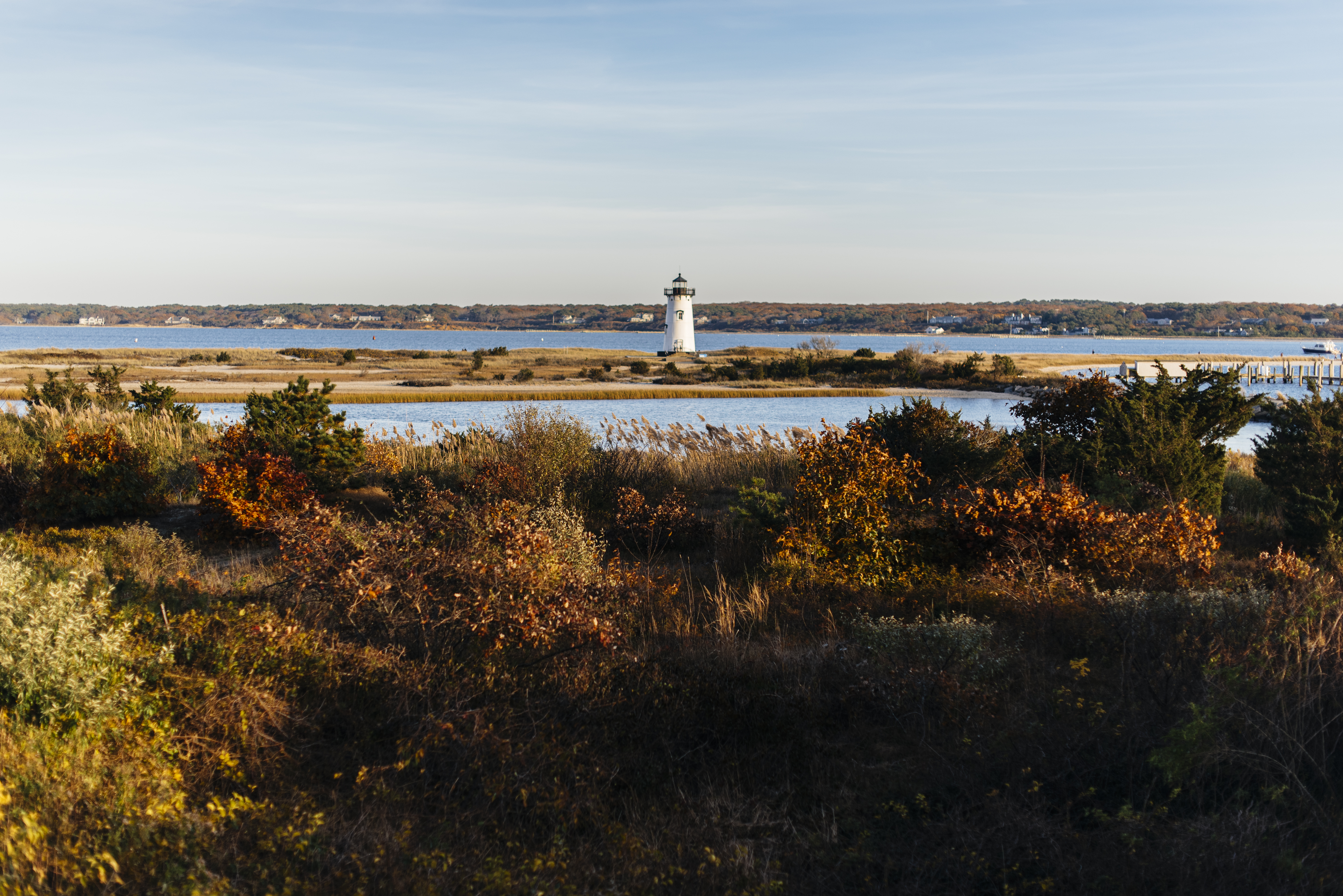
Edgartown Harbor Light in Autumn

Martha's Vineyard has a humid subtropical climate (Köppen Cfa) in all but the northernmost portions, which fall into the oceanic climate (Cfb) zone, but all of the island had an oceanic or even warm-summer humid continental climate (Dfb) as recent as the late 20th century. The climate is highly influenced by the surrounding Atlantic Ocean, which moderates temperatures throughout the year, although this moderation is nowhere near as strong as on opposite sides of the Atlantic (Porto, Portugal) or the Pacific coast of the United States (Crescent City) at similar latitudes.

Winter temperatures tend to be a few degrees warmer while summer temperatures tend to be cooler than inland locations. Winters are cool to cold with a January average of just above 32 °F (0.0 °C). Owing to the influence of the Atlantic Ocean, temperatures below 5 °F (−15.0 °C) are rare, occurring around once per year, with most days during the winter months rising above freezing. The average annual snowfall is 25.3 inches (643 mm). Summers are very warm and humid with only one or two days reaching or exceeding 90 °F (32.2 °C). The warmest months (July and August) average around 72 °F (22.2 °C).

Spring and fall are transition seasons with spring being cooler than fall. The highest daily maximum temperature was 99 °F (37.2 °C) on August 27, 1948, and the highest daily minimum temperature was 76 °F (24.4 °C) on September 4, 2010. The lowest daily maximum temperature was 7 °F (−13.9 °C) on December 26, 1980, and the lowest daily minimum temperature was −9 °F (−22.8 °C) on February 2 and 3, 1961. Martha's Vineyard receives 46.94 inches (1,192 mm) of precipitation per year, which is evenly distributed throughout the year. The hardiness zone is 7a in the central and most of the western areas of the main island and 7b on the east end including Chappaquiddick and the southwest end.

Climate data for Martha's Vineyard (Edgartown, Massachusetts) 1991–2020 normals, extremes 1946–present
Month	Jan	Feb	Mar	Apr	May	Jun	Jul	Aug	Sep	Oct	Nov	Dec	Year
Record high °F (°C)	65 (18)	64 (18)	75 (24)	90 (32)	91 (33)	95 (35)	95 (35)	99 (37)	92 (33)	88 (31)	74 (23)	67 (19)	99 (37)
Mean maximum °F (°C)	55.1 (12.8)	54.9 (12.7)	60.6 (15.9)	70.2 (21.2)	80.5 (26.9)	86.1 (30.1)	89.7 (32.1)	87.6 (30.9)	83.6 (28.7)	75.7 (24.3)	67.1 (19.5)	59.1 (15.1)	91.0 (32.8)
Mean daily maximum °F (°C)	40.1 (4.5)	41.5 (5.3)	46.4 (8.0)	55.4 (13.0)	64.9 (18.3)	73.8 (23.2)	80.4 (26.9)	79.9 (26.6)	74.0 (23.3)	64.0 (17.8)	54.4 (12.4)	45.5 (7.5)	60.0 (15.6)
Daily mean °F (°C)	32.9 (0.5)	34.1 (1.2)	39.0 (3.9)	47.5 (8.6)	56.7 (13.7)	65.7 (18.7)	72.3 (22.4)	71.9 (22.2)	66.2 (19.0)	56.1 (13.4)	47.0 (8.3)	38.4 (3.6)	52.3 (11.3)
Mean daily minimum °F (°C)	25.6 (−3.6)	26.8 (−2.9)	31.7 (−0.2)	39.5 (4.2)	48.6 (9.2)	57.6 (14.2)	64.2 (17.9)	63.9 (17.7)	58.4 (14.7)	48.2 (9.0)	39.7 (4.3)	31.3 (−0.4)	44.6 (7.0)
Mean minimum °F (°C)	6.8 (−14.0)	10.1 (−12.2)	16.3 (−8.7)	27.5 (−2.5)	35.1 (1.7)	45.8 (7.7)	53.7 (12.1)	53.0 (11.7)	44.0 (6.7)	32.8 (0.4)	22.7 (−5.2)	15.1 (−9.4)	5.1 (−14.9)
Record low °F (°C)	−6 (−21)	−9 (−23)	−7 (−22)	12 (−11)	28 (−2)	37 (3)	45 (7)	41 (5)	32 (0)	22 (−6)	14 (−10)	−5 (−21)	−9 (−23)
Average precipitation inches (mm)	4.10 (104)	3.57 (91)	4.80 (122)	4.18 (106)	3.74 (95)	3.39 (86)	2.64 (67)	3.72 (94)	3.89 (99)	4.63 (118)	4.21 (107)	4.84 (123)	47.71 (1,212)
Average snowfall inches (cm)	8.8 (22)	8.1 (21)	4.7 (12)	0.3 (0.76)	0.0 (0.0)	0.0 (0.0)	0.0 (0.0)	0.0 (0.0)	0.0 (0.0)	0.0 (0.0)	0.0 (0.0)	3.4 (8.6)	25.3 (64)
Average precipitation days (≥ 0.01 in)	11.9	9.8	11.4	11.9	12.0	10.2	7.8	8.9	9.3	11.2	11.4	12.1	127.9
Average snowy days (≥ 0.1 in)	3.5	3.3	2.0	0.2	0.0	0.0	0.0	0.0	0.0	0.0	0.1	1.4	10.5
Source: NOAA

== Towns ==
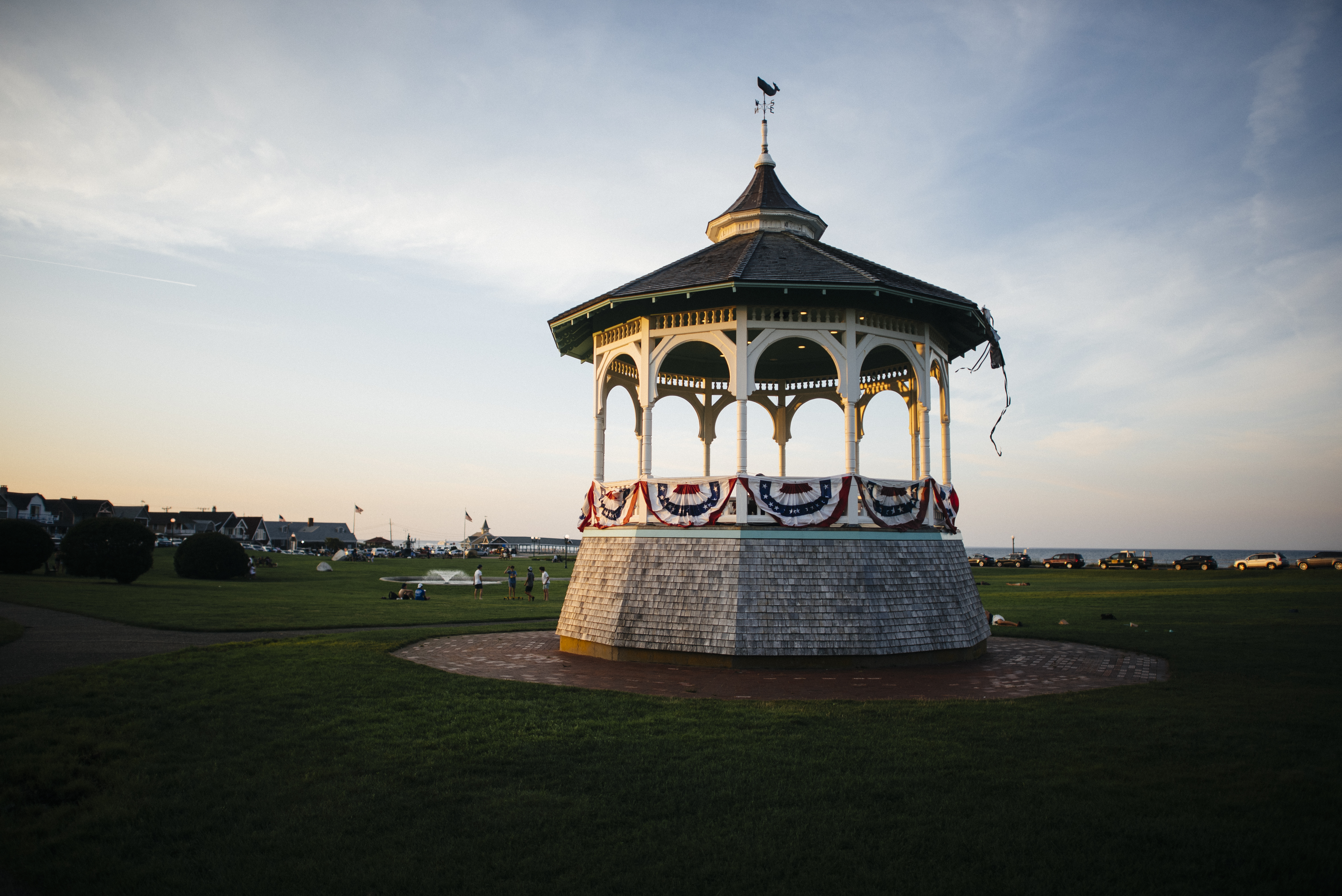
Ocean Park bandstand, Oak Bluffs

Martha's Vineyard is divided into six towns. Each town is governed by a Board of Selectmen elected by town voters in each of the towns, along with annual and periodic town meetings. Each town is a member of the Martha's Vineyard Commission, which regulates island-wide building, environmental, and aesthetic concerns.

Some government programs—such as the special education system, emergency management, and waste management—have been regionalized. There is a growing push for further regionalization in areas such as law enforcement, public schools, water treatment, and medical services.

The towns are:

- Tisbury, which includes Vineyard Haven and the West Chop peninsula. It is the primary port of entry for people and cargo, supplemented by the seasonal port in Oak Bluffs. The Martha's Vineyard Museum is located Vineyard Haven.
- Edgartown, which includes Chappaquiddick Island and Katama. Edgartown is noted for its rich whaling tradition and is the largest town by population and area.
- Oak Bluffs is best known for its gingerbread cottages, its open harbor, and its vibrant town along busy Circuit Avenue. Oak Bluffs enjoys a reputation as one of the more active night-life towns for both residents and tourists. It was known as "Cottage City" from its separation from Edgartown in 1880 until its reincorporation as Oak Bluffs in 1907. Oak Bluffs includes several communities that have been popular destinations for affluent African Americans since the early 20th century. It also includes the East Chop peninsula, Lagoon Heights, and Harthaven.
- West Tisbury is an agricultural center and it hosts the Martha's Vineyard Agricultural Fair in late August each year.
- Chilmark, including the fishing village of Menemsha. Chilmark is also rural and features the island's hilliest terrain. It is the birthplace of George Claghorn, master shipbuilder of the USS Constitution, a.k.a. "Old Ironsides".
- Aquinnah, formerly called Gay Head, is home to the Wampanoag Indian tribe and clay cliffs.

== Transportation ==
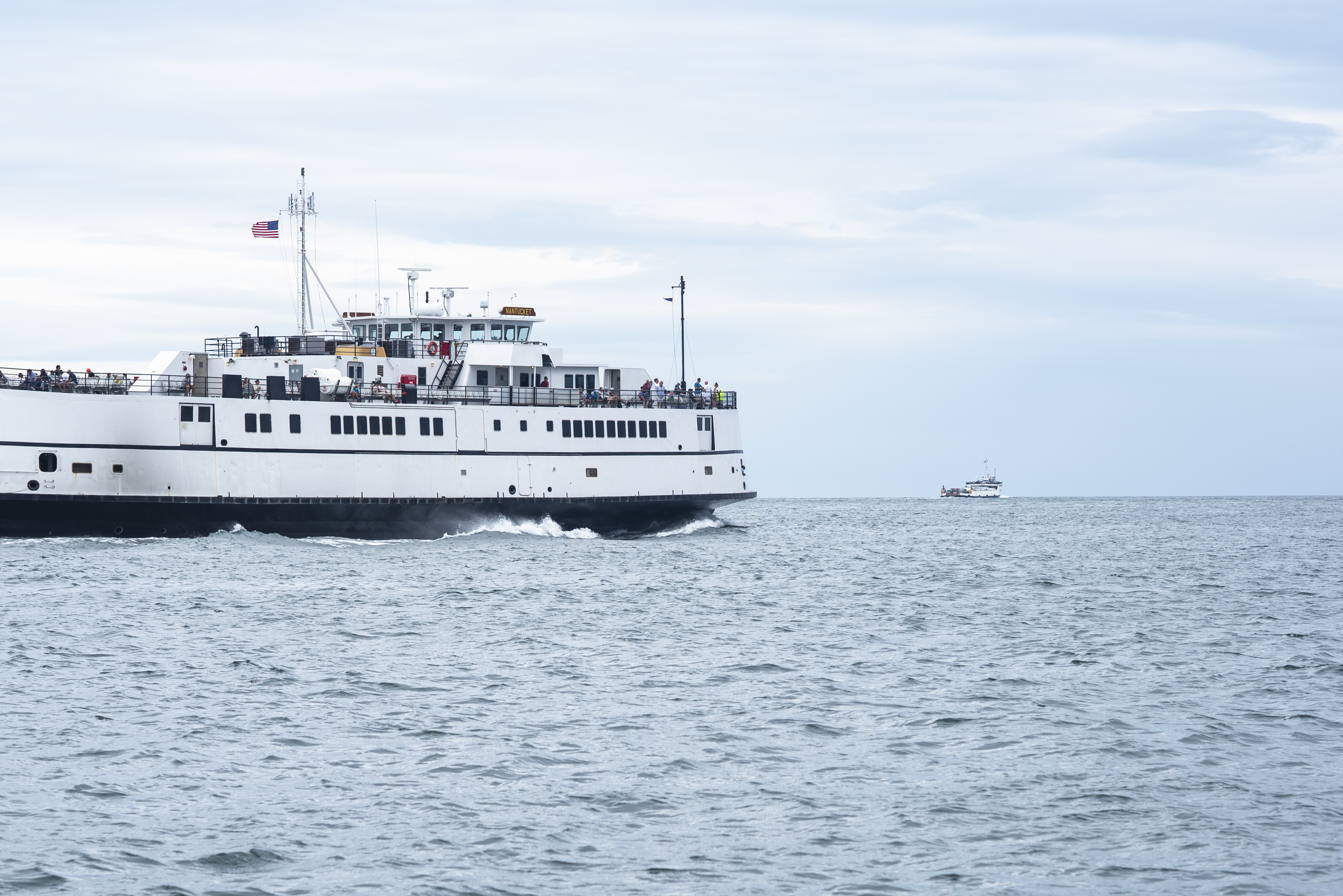
Ferries running between Woods Hole and Martha's Vineyard operated by the Steamship Authority

In the era before modern highways and jet planes, travelers took New York, New Haven & Hartford Railroad trains from New York City or Boston to Woods Hole or Hyannis, at which point they would embark on ferries to the island. The Martha's Vineyard Transit Authority provides year-round bus service throughout Martha's Vineyard.

Martha's Vineyard is accessible via ferry. The Steamship Authority operates year-round ferry service from Woods Hole. This is the only ferry that can transport vehicles to and from the island. Seasonal ferry services depart from Falmouth, Hyannis, and New Bedford in Massachusetts, North Kingstown in Rhode Island, and limited service from New York City to New Jersey.

Martha's Vineyard Airport is the main airport on the island. Cape Air provides year-round service to and from Boston and New York City. Seasonal destinations include Hyannis, New Bedford, Nantucket, White Plains, New York, Washington-Reagan, New York-LaGuardia, Philadelphia and Charlotte. JetBlue, Delta, American Airlines, and Elite Airways operate seasonal flights from New York City and Boston.

== Education ==
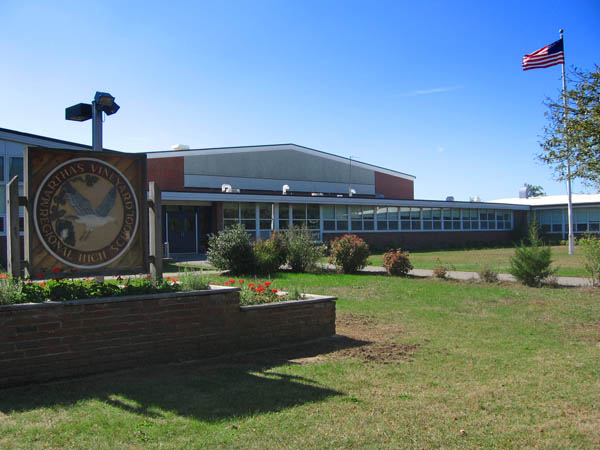
Martha's Vineyard Regional High School

Martha's Vineyard is served by Martha's Vineyard Public Schools:

- Edgartown School (K-8), serving Edgartown
- Oak Bluffs School (K–8), serving Oak Bluffs
- Tisbury School (K–8), serving Tisbury (Vineyard Haven)
- West Tisbury School (K–8), serving West Tisbury, welcomes Chilmark and Aquinnah students in grades 6-8
- Chilmark School (K–5), serving Chilmark and Aquinnah
- Martha's Vineyard Regional High School (9–12), serving all six towns
- Martha's Vineyard Public Charter School (K–12), island-wide charter school serving all six towns

The towns are each served by local K–8 or K–5 schools (Aquinnah and Chilmark are split between Chilmark for elementary and West Tisbury for middle school), and all feed into the regional high school. Additionally, the K–12 public charter school in West Tisbury is open to students from any town on the island.

== Tourism and culture ==
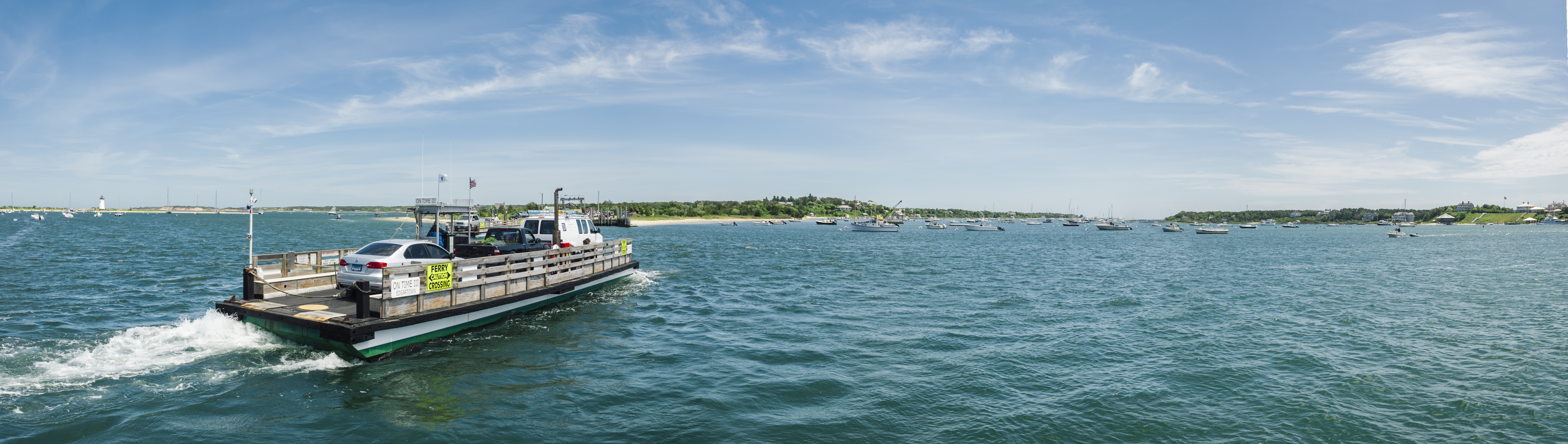
The ferry between Edgartown village and Chappaquiddick Island

During the whaling era, wealthy Boston sea captains and merchant traders created estates on Martha's Vineyard with their trading profits. Today, the Vineyard has become one of the Northeastern United States' most prominent summering havens, having attracted numerous celebrity regulars.

The island has a year-round population of about 20,530 people; in summer, the population increases to 200,000 residents, with more than 25,000 additional short-term visitors coming and going on the ferries during the summer season. The most crowded weekend is July 4, followed by the late-August weekend of the Agricultural Fair. In general, the summer season runs from June through Labor Day weekend, coinciding with the months most American children are not in school.

In 1985, Martha's Vineyard and Chappaquiddick Island were included in an American Viticultural Area designation for wine appellation of origin specification: Martha's Vineyard AVA. Wines produced from grapes grown on the two islands can be sold with labels that carry the Martha's Vineyard AVA designation. Martha's Vineyard was the home to the winemaker Chicama Vineyards in West Tisbury, though it closed after 37 years in 2008.

Other popular attractions include the annual Grand Illumination in Oak Bluffs; the Martha's Vineyard Film Center, an arthouse cinema which is run by the non-profit Martha's Vineyard Film Society, and which screens independent and world cinema all year long; the historic Capawock and Strand theatres, also run by the Martha's Vineyard Film Society, the Martha's Vineyard Film Festival, which runs a winter film festival in March, a Summer Film Series and Cinema Circus every Wednesday in July and August, the Martha's Vineyard African-American Film Festival, which showcases the works of independent and established African-American filmmakers in August, and Martha's Vineyard International Film Festival in September; the Farm Institute at Katama Farm in Edgartown; and the Flying Horses Carousel in Oak Bluffs, the oldest operating platform carousel in the United States.

Across the Edgartown Vineyard Haven Road from the Martha's Vineyard Regional High School in Oak Bluffs, the Martha's Vineyard Skatepark is a concrete skatepark open to the public, offering a range of ramps and obstacles.

=== Island life and residents ===
Its relatively small year-round population has led to an activist citizenry. Tourism, overdevelopment, politics, and environmentalism are of keen interest to the community, which seeks to balance the tourist economy with the ecology and wildlife needs. In contrast to the seasonal influx of wealthy visitors, Dukes County remains one of the poorest in the state. Residents have established resources to balance the contradictions and stresses that can arise in these circumstances, notably the Martha's Vineyard Commission and Martha's Vineyard Community Services Many high-profile residents, movie stars, politicians, writers, and artists contribute to fundraisers and benefits that raise awareness of the fragile ecosystem of the Vineyard and support community organizations and services. The largest of these is the annual Possible Dreams Auction.

The majority of the Vineyard's residents during the summer are well-established seasonal vacationers. While many of these come from all over the United States and abroad, the island tends to be a destination for especially those whose primary residence lies within close proximity in the Northeastern U.S. Many communities around the island tend to have deep family roots on the island that have matured over the years to create hamlets of good friends and neighbors. Nevertheless, many visitors are summer renters and weekenders.

Martha's Vineyard has been or is home to many artists and musicians, including Thomas Hart Benton, Albert Alcalay, Evan Dando, Tim Burton, James Taylor, Carly Simon, Livingston Taylor, Kate Taylor, Alex Taylor, Tom Rush, Rick Marotta, Geoff Muldaur, Maria Muldaur, Willy Mason, Unbusted and Mike Nichols. Authors have included David McCullough, Susan Branch, Judy Blume, Norman Bridwell, Richard North Patterson, Linda Fairstein, Shel Silverstein, William Styron, John Hersey, Dorothy West, Geraldine Brooks, and Tony Horwitz. Various writers have been inspired by the island—including the mystery writer Philip R. Craig who set several novels on the island. Brooks wrote a book of historical fiction Caleb's Crossing in which Caleb Cheeshahteaumuck is the title character and depicts early colonial settlement of Martha's Vineyard. Martha's Vineyard Poet Laureate, Lee H. McCormack, has written many poems about the island. Actors include Patricia Neal, James Cagney, Lillian Hellman (who is buried in Abel's Hill Cemetery), and Katharine Cornell. Life magazine photographer Alfred Eisenstaedt was a summer resident.

Other well-known celebrities who live on or have regularly visited the island: Lois Mailou Jones, David Letterman, Bill Murray, Tony Shalhoub, Quincy Jones, Ted Danson and wife Mary Steenburgen, Larry David, the Farrelly brothers, Meg Ryan, Chelsea Handler, Mike Wallace, and Walter Cronkite. Other regularly appearing celebrities include Spike Lee, Alan Dershowitz, Dan Aykroyd, James Belushi, Vernon Jordan, Diane Sawyer, Kenneth Cole, William Luers, and Charlayne Hunter-Gault. Despite popular perceptions of the Vineyard as "Hollywood East", the island is generally low-key and quiet. Locals tend to be protective of celebrity privacy, though local newspaper coverage sometime threatens the privacy.

Many affluent African-American families have enjoyed a century-old tradition of summering on the island. The community is known as a popular summer destination for judges, physicians, business executives, surgeons, attorneys, writers, politicians, and professors. Town Beach was pejoratively called "The Inkwell", a nickname which was reappropriated as an emblem of pride. The Inkwell (1994), directed by Matty Rich, deals with this close-knit Vineyard community. The Run&Shoot Filmworks Martha's Vineyard African-American Film Festival, held every second week in August, highlights the works of independent and established filmmakers from across the globe. This annual event draws attendees from all across the world.

Since the 19th century, the island has had a sizable community of Portuguese-Americans, concentrated primarily in Oak Bluffs, Tisbury, and Edgartown; they have traditionally worked alongside other island residents in whaling and fishing. It also has a large community of Brazilian immigrants who work mainly in the maintenance of the island's vacation facilities.

The permanent residents were profiled in an August 2009 London Telegraph article showing "the dark side of Martha's Vineyard". In the same month an article titled "Edgartown's Darker Side" appeared in the Boston Globe detailing the poor working conditions suffered by Irish and Serbian students in a private members club in Edgartown. Concerns over munitions that may be buried on Martha's Vineyard, most from World War II, have led to an 8.1 million dollar project to remove and rebuild part of a privately owned barrier beach off the Tisbury Great Pond.

The year-round working population of Martha's Vineyard earns 30 percent less on average than other residents of the state while keeping up with a cost of living that is 60 percent higher than average.

== Media ==
=== Local newspapers and magazines ===
- Martha's Vineyard Magazine
- Vineyard Gazette
- The Martha's Vineyard Times

=== Radio ===
==== FM ====
- WMVY/88.7-Edgartown: Adult Album Alternative
- WBUA/92.7-Tisbury: Public radio (relays WBUR-FM Boston)
- WVVY-LP/96.7-Tisbury: Community radio

=== Television ===
==== Over-the-air ====
Television broadcasts are available using varied methods from nearby broadcast markets.

- From Boston via U.S. satellite providers, Comcast Xfinity, and RCN Cable providers.
- Or via over-the-air television stations from: Boston, New Bedford and Providence, Rhode Island; with reception methods powerful enough to receive it.

==== Cable ====
- MVTV: Martha's Vineyard Community Television (Comcast Channels 6, 8, 9)

== See also ==
- Elizabeth Islands
  - Cuttyhunk
  - Naushon Island
- Outer Lands
- Vineyard Golf Club
- Martha's Vineyard Sign Language
