= Harthaven, Massachusetts =

- William H. Hart house, Harthaven MA

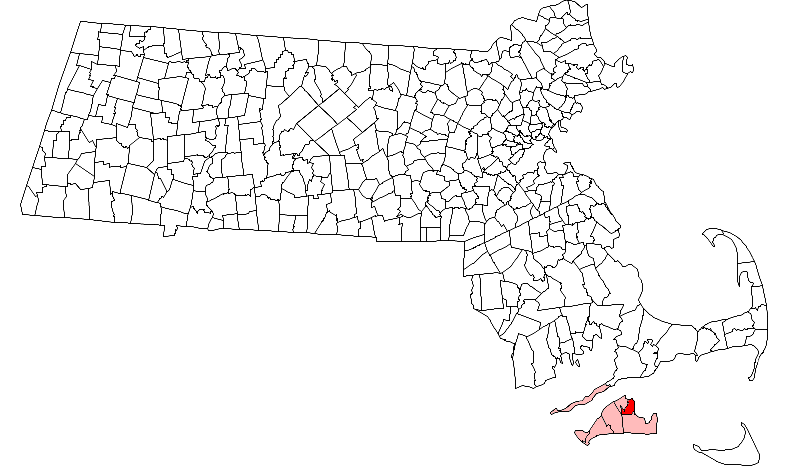
- Location in Dukes County in Massachusetts
- Coordinates: 41°26′35″N 070°33′23″W
- Country: United States
- State: Massachusetts
- County: Dukes
- Settled: 1911
- Elevation: 13 ft (4 m)
- Time zone: UTC-5 (Eastern)
  - Summer (DST): UTC-4 (Eastern)
- ZIP code: 02557
- Area code: 508 / 774
- GNIS feature ID: 617419
- Website: www.ci.oak-bluffs.ma.us

Harthaven is a community in the town of Oak Bluffs located on Martha's Vineyard in Dukes County, Massachusetts, United States.

== History ==
Harthaven was first settled by William H. Hart who purchased five lots from the Oak Bluffs Land and Wharf Company in 1871. Two years later he added an additional three lots. In 1911 he expanded his holdings to include more land south of Farm Pond and the Harthaven community was established between the end of the Oak Bluffs seawall and Sengekontacket Pond. Initially the community was made up entirely of members of his family who originally had chosen the Vineyard as a place to spend the summer but gradually began to stay there year-round after 1911. In 1914 the Vineyard Gazette referred to the community as the "Hart Settlement off the Beach Road". Eventually other New England families such as the Eddys and Youngs married into the Harts, for example when Ethelbert Allen Moore married Martha Hart, a daughter of William H. Hart.

== See also ==
- Flying Horses Carousel
- Martha's Vineyard
- Vineyard Haven

== Gallery ==
William H. Hart's grandson's First World War commendation
