= MVTA =

MVTA can refer to:

- Martha's Vineyard Transit Authority
- Minnesota Valley Transit Authority
- Motor Vehicle Traffic Accident Still used in legacy healthcare clinical/diagnostic coding despite more-commonly being referred to as Motor Vehicle Collision (MCV).
