= Martha's Vineyard Poet Laureate =

The concept of the position of Martha's Vineyard Poet Laureate was formally initiated in 2011 by the Martha's Vineyard Poetry Society. This was the first time in Martha's Vineyard history that a position was created to designate an island-wide poet laureate. On similar note, the Martha's Vineyard Poetry Society (MVPS) is the first island-wide poetry organization with membership in the history of Martha's Vineyard. MVPS was founded in 2008 by island poet/author/musician, William Waterway.

The Martha's Vineyard Poetry Society (MVPS) is composed of a group of approximately 410 island poets and supporters who seek to enhance the presence of poetry on the Vineyard and throughout the world. The purpose of Martha's Vineyard Poetry Society's is to promote poetry on Martha's Vineyard through education and through the support of existing and new poetry groups. It is the organization's hope that through elevation of poetry in people's lives and consciousness – it will facilitate a positive contribution to Martha's Vineyard culture and life styles.

Over the years, MVPS has sponsored and hosted free public poetry events such as: "Martha's Vineyard Poet Laureate" celebration gatherings; “Summer Solstice In Poetry and Song” held at Featherstone Center for the Arts; "Winter Solstice in Poetry and Song" held at the Vineyard Haven Public Library; “A Gathering of Island Poets and Musicians” – a four-hour MVTV television production broadcast “live” via Comcast to the island community; “Martha’s Vineyard Poem in Your Pocket Day (MVPIYPD)”, held in conjunction with National Poem in Your Pocket (PIYP) day; the Gay Head Lighthouse poetry book project that published Lighthouse Legacy; "Civil War Poetry" at the Vineyard Haven Public Library with support from the American Library Association (ALA), and the National Endowment for the Arts (NEA), and, many other poetry programs on the island of Martha's Vineyard.

== Designation of first Martha's Vineyard Poet Laureate (MVPoetLaureate) in the island's history ==
Martha's Vineyard has a community of poets and poetry groups. In addition to year-round residents, the island has seasonal presentations by poets, including United States Poets Laureate.

The position of MV Poet Laureate was presented to the public by the 431-member Martha's Vineyard Poetry Society in July 2012. Prior to this, there never was a designated Martha's Vineyard Poet Laureate throughout the island's history. To accomplish the task of designating the island's first MV Poet Laureate, the Martha's Vineyard Poetry Society's founder, William Waterway, created a double-blind election process that precluded politicking, lobbying, or collusion.

== Martha's Vineyard's First Poet Laureate, Lee H. McCormack – the election process ==
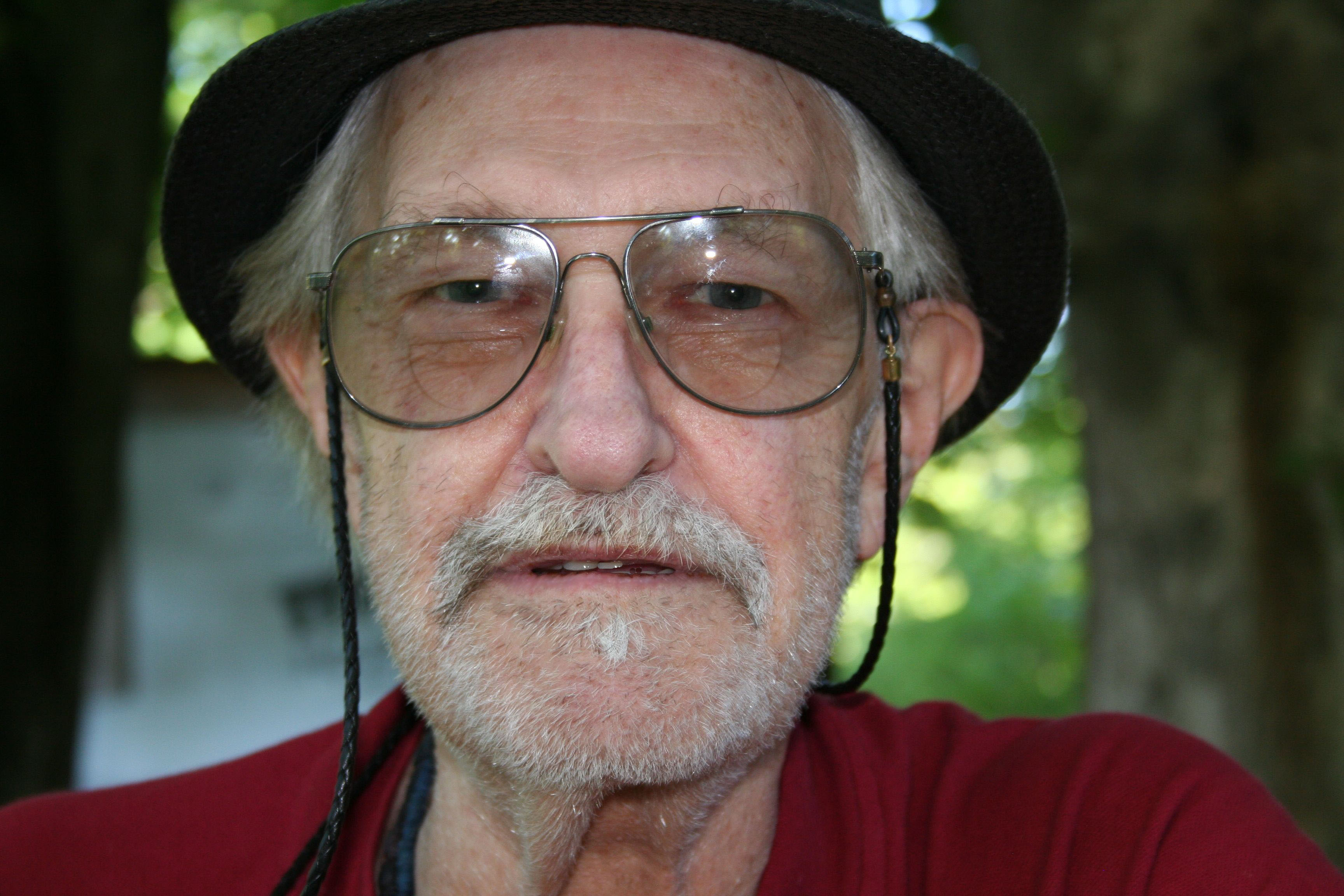
Lee H. McCormack, first Martha's Vineyard Poet Laureate (MV Poet Laureate)

Following a year-long judging process – Lee H. McCormack was selected as the island's first Martha's Vineyard Poet Laureate in July 2012. A jury of ten qualified literary judges from representatives of the Martha's Vineyard Poetry Society, island libraries, writers, and poetry groups made the selection. Mr. McCormack was one out of a field of twenty-six participating poets. Each poet submitted five of their finest poems to the Martha's Vineyard Poetry Society. The poems were then copied and distributed to the judges without identifying marks except for a number assigned to each poet. All judging was based solely on the merits of submitted poems. Each of the ten judges did not know the names of the poets they were judging. On similar note, participating poets did not know the names of the ten judges.

The names of the winning poet was revealed to the judges after the numerical judging results were submitted and calculated. Shortly after the judging process, a public announcement and media release shared the name of the winning poet. The Martha's Vineyard Poetry Society, in conjunction with the Vineyard Haven Public Library, held a festive evening to inaugurate and celebrate the island's first Martha's Vineyard Poet Laureate.

Since his election, MV Poet Laureate, Lee, H. McCormack has undertaken several public library poetry gatherings – as well as participating in the Featherstone Center for the Arts evening of "Fall Poetry and Music." Mr. McCormack is also organizing a series of workshops with island poetry groups; libraries; schools; cultural institutions, and council on aging organizations. MV Poet Laureate McCormack read his shark conservation and education poem, entitled, The Apex, before an audience exceeding 2,000 people at the "Jaws Fest The Tribute", festival in 2012.

Lee H. McCormack was a year-round Martha's Vineyard resident who lived on the island of Martha's Vineyard for over 40-years. He was a member of the Cleaveland House Poets of West Tisbury on Martha's Vineyard. Cleaveland House Poets, is a poetry group that has grown out of a poetry group founded in the house of same name by Dionis Coffin Riggs. The group has met every two weeks since c1960. MV Poet Laureate Lee McCormack composed poetry from age twelve, and undertook intensive poetry studies with: Galway Kinnell; Sharon Olds; Charles Simic; Robert Pinsky; Thomas Lux; Peter Klappert; Steve Orlen; George Mills (writer); Short-term critical studies with: Michael Ryan; AI; Single Summer Resident at Warren Wilson College MFA Program for Writers.

He died on April 15, 2020.

== Community responsibilities of Martha's Vineyard Poet Laureate ==
The Martha's Vineyard Poet Laureate is a two-year term position. The MV Poet Laureate is responsible for promoting poetry and educating the public about the merits of the high-art form of poetry. This effort includes outreach poetry programs through schools; senior centers; social institutions; churches; media; writers groups; memorials, and appropriate political gatherings on and off the island of Martha's Vineyard.

== Martha's Vineyard's Poet Laureate, Arnie Reisman ==
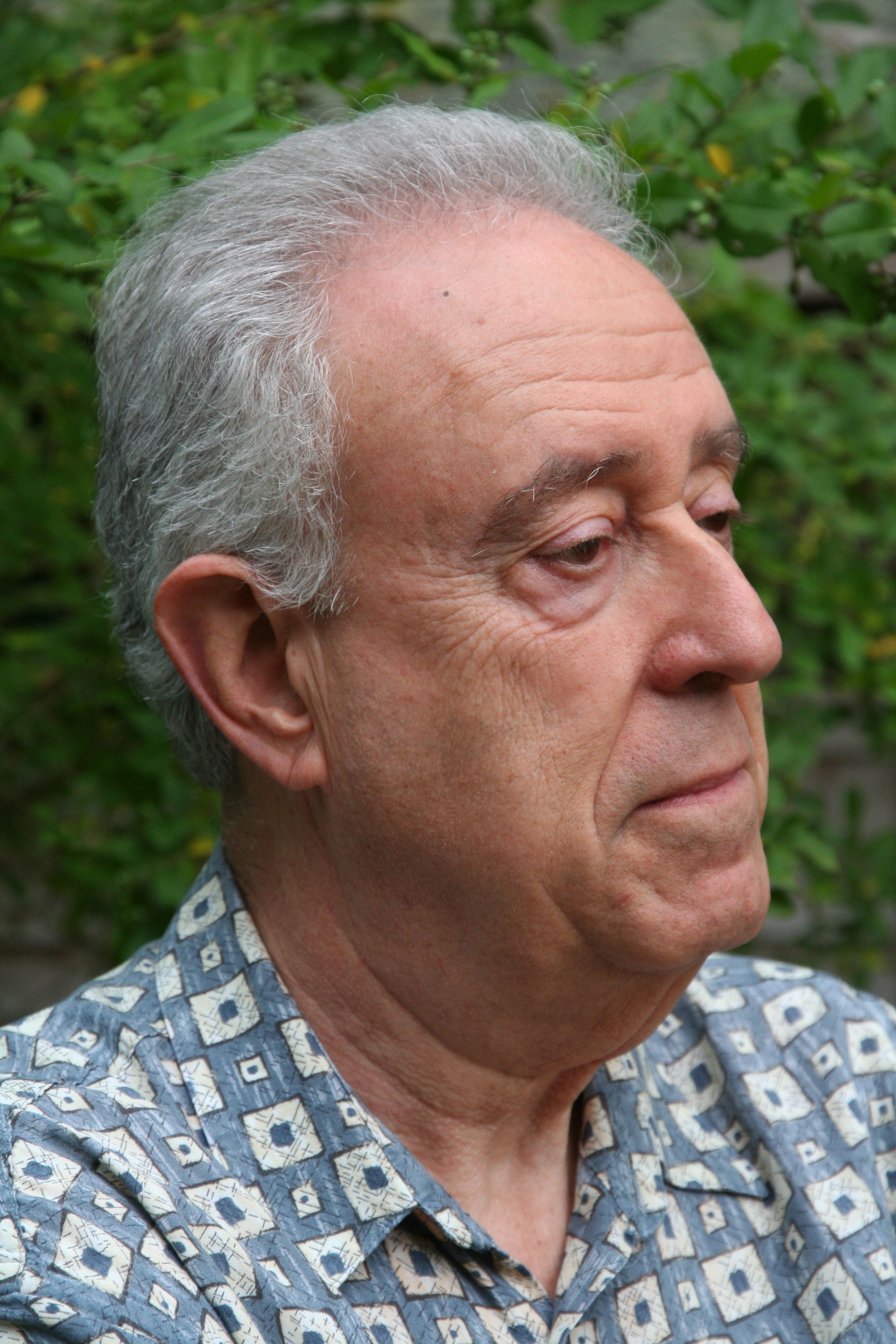
Arnie Reisman, previous Martha's Vineyard Poet Laureate, offers his national media talent and cultivation as a "closet poet."

Arnie Reisman was selected in September 2014 as the island's second MV Poet Laureate. Reisman is a writer, producer and performer, who is featured in commercial and public television, radio, corporate video, private and public media publications, theatre and film. He has been a panelist on National Public Radio's "Says You"!, since its inception in 1996. "Says You" is a weekly NPR comedy quiz show airing in more than 120 markets, that also includes his wife, Paula Lyons, former national consumer reporter.

For more than 25 years, Arnie Reisman has served as a writer-producer and on-air performer and commentator at Boston TV stations WCVB (ABC) and WGBH (PBS). In 2009, with Ann Carol Grossman, he produced for PBS The Powder & the Glory, the film focusing on the business rivalry and cultural influences of Helena Rubinstein and Elizabeth Arden. PBS has broadcast the film every March—Women's History Month.

His national telecasts include Hollywood on Trial (Oscar-nominated documentary on the blacklist), The Other Side of the Moon (90-minute PBS special for 20th anniversary of the lunar landing) and PBS' AIDS Quarterly with Peter Jennings. He was also the executive editor of the news weekly, "Boston After Dark" (now the late Boston Phoenix), and serves as the chair of the annual Bill of Rights Dinner for the American Civil Liberties Union of Massachusetts.

Arnie Reisman also writes a column, The Washashore Chronicles, for the local Vineyard Gazette newspaper. He spends his spare time writing plays, walking his dog, and composing poetry.

One of the first community based projects Arnie Reisman initiated as MV Poet Laureate, was to create and host a monthly "Poetry Cafe'" at the newly renovated Vineyard Playhouse. While hosting the Poetry Cafe', Reisman blends interludes of his poetry with that of three poets selected from the island poetry community. The hour-and-a-half event includes social time with deserts and beverages before and after the event's poetry readings.

== Brief history of Martha's Vineyard poetry ==
Martha's Vineyard has a history of attracting people of note as well as those involved with the arts – including: dancers; actors; singer/songwriters; authors; playwrights; artists; sitting United States presidents; and poets. The island's storied history with poetry begins with the writings of the first colonialists, who wrote poetic prose that is recognized today as a form called poesy. Another historic island connection to poetry is that with novelist and civil war poet, Herman Melville. As Martha's Vineyard entered the whaling era – many whaling ship crew members, including many island women, also put poetic pen to paper.

Martha's Vineyard appears to have always cultivated a culture of poetry. From diaries of men at sea longing for their wives and family at home, to the hardships and beauty of island life – poetry served island people as a form of sharing their thoughts and emotions. Through the 1970s–80s, there were a series of island coffee houses presenting poetry to relatively large numbers of people. Wintertide Coffee House, located at Five Corners, and Daggett House Cafe', located at the Vineyard Playhouse, were the two most prominent coffee houses serving up poetry on a weekly basis. There was also the UU church gatherings organized by Ingrid Goff. Ingrid Goff and volunteers would set up linen covered tables with candles and small vases of flowers at the Unitarian Universalist Church – and would feature intimate evenings of poetry accompanied by musical interludes. On similar note during the early 1980s, the furniture store, Vineyard Decorators, which was located on State Road in Vineyard Haven at the old Coca Cola bottling plant, established for a brief time an "invitation only" poetry lounge. Poets would gather for intimate recitals on expensive furnishings arranged as a living room setting.

During the early 1900s, the up-island home of Dionis Coffin Riggs (1898–1997) – situated in the town of West Tisbury, became the island's de facto center of poetry. Ms. Riggs' home was the historic "Cleaveland House." The Cleaveland House has been in the same family for over 250 years, and has always served as a meeting place of island intellectuals, politicians, and writers. Circa 1960, Ms. Riggs began hosting poetry gatherings at her home. Since its inception, this group of poets met every two weeks to share, discuss, and criticize the original poems of attending members. To embellish the literary experience at her home, Ms. Riggs hosted "black bean dinners" every Saturday evening as a vehicle for poets and writers to share discourse. Since 1960, member poets have met every two weeks at Cleaveland House with little interruption over the years, and continue to do so at the present. The continuity and longevity of this poetry group at Cleaveland House makes it the most successful, longest lived writers' group in the history of Martha's Vineyard and the United States. Following Dionis Coffin Riggs death, the group was served by chairpersons Ruth Cochrane, who was followed by Judith Neeld. William Waterway was appointed as the group's Chair by Cynthia Riggs in 2004. Waterway renamed the group from the loosely applied name, "Wednesday's Poets", to "Cleaveland House Poets" to honor the name of the B&B house where the group met.

In the 1990s the group published a book of poetry entitled, "Wednesday's Poets". The title reflects the day of week the Cleaveland House Poets have historically gathered. Contributing poets to this anthology were: Jane Brown; Ruth Cochrane; Janet Holladay; Russ Hoxsie; Bob Kaplan; Judith Neeld; Katrina Nevin; Brooks Robards; Valerie Sonnenthal; Holly Wayman, and Sally Williams.

Today, the Cleaveland House poets members include: Ellie Bates, Bob Kaplan, Peter Lederman, Chris Legge, Bob Kaplan, Lee H. McCormack, Don McLagan, Judith Neeld, Fanny Staunton Ogilvie, Susan Puciul, Andrea B. Quigley, Arnie Riesman, Cynthia Riggs, Brooks Robard, Kara Taylor, Jennifer Smith Turner, Annette Sandrock and Valerie Sonnenthal.

In 2009, former Chair, William Waterway, changed the name of the group to Cleaveland House Poets, and began promoting the group with Cynthia Riggs at public readings with this new moniker. The group recently published an anthology entitled: "Cleaveland House Poets, 50 Years". Cleaveland House Poets is now recognized as the oldest, continuously meeting poetry group in the history of Martha's Vineyard as well as of the entire United States.

Besides the Martha's Vineyard Poetry Society, various island organizations and libraries have sponsored educational poetry programs, including the Martha's Vineyard Regional High School and island elementary schools; the Nathan Mayhew Seminars; Feathestone Center for the Arts; Martha's Vineyard Poets Collective; Noepe Institute; Martha's Vineyard Writers Residency; Pathways Projects; Alex's Place, and various council on aging and senior centers.

The position of West Tisbury Poet Laureate had its genesis with Dionis Coffin Riggs, who founded a poetry group at her ancestral West Tisbury Home circa 1960. This group adopted the name Cleaveland House Poets in late 1990s to honor Dionis' bread and breakfast of same name. During her active life as a poet and writer, Dionis Coffin Riggs was sometimes referred to the island's poet laureate. Dionis would flinch at this, stating that Poet Laureate is not a lighthearted sobriquet. In honor of her mother's memory, Cynthia Riggs undertook the task of creating the position of West Tisbury Poet Laureate.

About ten years after Dionis' death, in spring of 2006, Cynthia Riggs petitioned the town of West Tisbury to put an article on the Annual Town Meeting warrant to establish the position of West Tisbury Poet Laureate. The position of West Tisbury Poet Laureate officially came into existence on 11 April 2006 by a voice vote at the West Tisbury Annual Town Meeting. Soon afterwards, at the recommendation of an advisory committee formed by the West Tisbury Library, the Selectmen appointed Daniel Waters as the town's first Poet Laureate. Since Daniel Waters selection, there have been two other poets selected to fill the position – Fan Ogilvie, and Justen Ahren. On similar note, in December 2011, the selectmen of the Martha's Vineyard town of Edgartown appointed Steve Ewing as their first Edgartown Poet Laureate.

As documented above – in July 2012 – the first Martha's Vineyard Poet Laureate (MV Poet Laureate)was selected by a panel of ten literary judges organized under the auspices of the Martha's Vineyard Poetry Society. The Martha's Vineyard Poet Laureate (MVPL) is encouraged to work with island media; poetry organizations; towns, and schools to further the public's appreciation of poetry on a local and global basis.
