= VTA =

VTA may refer to:

== Organizations ==
- Vancouver Traffic Authority, a department within the Vancouver Police Department
- Valley Transportation Authority, California, United States
- Martha's Vineyard Transit Authority, Massachusetts, United States
- VTA, Russian language acronym for Military Transport Aviation

== Other ==
- Vascular-targeting agent, anti-cancer drug
- Ventral tegmental area (in neuroanatomy), part of the midbrain tegmentum
