= Martha's Vineyard Regional High School =

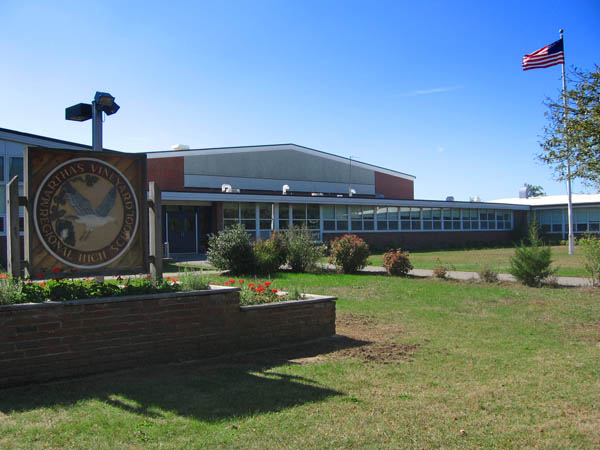

Location
- 100 Edgartown-Vineyard Haven Road; Oak Bluffs, Massachusetts 02557; United States; 41°25′4″N 70°35′47″W

Information
- Type: Public high school
- Established: 1959
- School district: Martha's Vineyard Public Schools
- Superintendent: Matt D'Andrea
- Principal: Sara Dingledy
- Teaching staff: 87.38 (FTE)
- Grades: 9–12
- Enrollment: 744 (2024–2025)
- Student to teacher ratio: 8.51
- Hours in school day: 7:40–2:05
- Campus type: Rural
- Colors: Purple and white
- Athletics conference: Eastern Athletic Conference
- Nickname: Vineyarders
- Rival: Nantucket High School
- Newspaper: The High School View
- Communities served: Oak Bluffs, Edgartown, Tisbury, West Tisbury, Chilmark, Aquinnah
- Alumni: Solon Oliver

Martha's Vineyard Regional High School or MVRHS is the primary public high school for the island of Martha's Vineyard, Massachusetts, United States. It is located in Oak Bluffs.

== History ==
MVRHS opened in September 1959. It is the larger of the two high schools located on Martha's Vineyard, the other being the Martha's Vineyard Public Charter School in West Tisbury. MVRHS is part of the Martha's Vineyard Public Schools and serves the six towns on the island: Oak Bluffs, Edgartown, Tisbury, West Tisbury, Chilmark and Aquinnah.

== Academics ==
MVRHS has a comprehensive high school with a Career Tech program that offers training in automotive, building trades, horticulture, culinary, maritime studies, and health assisting. MVRHS offers an alternative program known as the Rebecca Amos Institute, an open-campus program offering individualized instruction for a small group of students. Students can choose to engage in extracurricular activities including community service, sports, art, drama and debate. MVRHS won two National Blue Ribbon School Awards. MVRHS is one of the very few schools to have won this honor two times. Most recently, MVRHS was the only public high school in Massachusetts selected for Award and one of 111 nationwide.

== Athletics ==
Martha's Vineyard's athletic teams are called the Vineyarders, and their colors are purple and white. Martha's Vineyard is a member of the Eastern Athletic Conference, which competes at the Division 2 and 3 levels of competition. Members of the EAC are Bishop Feehan High School, Bishop Stang High School, Coyle & Cassidy High School, and Somerset-Berkley Regional High School. Before they joined the EAC in 2010, they had previously been a member of the Mayflower League, which competes at the Division 5 & 6 level, and is also the largest high school athletics conference in Massachusetts.

=== Football ===
The Vineyarders have a long-standing rivalry with Nantucket High School. Their rivalry culminates every year in the annual Island Cup. Martha's Vineyard and Nantucket are located approximately 15 miles apart from each other, and the only way to reach the islands is either by ferry or by airplane. In 2010, the U.S. Marine Corps chose to include the Nantucket vs. Martha's Vineyard football game on their list of 42 Great American Rivalries. It was the only New England football game to make the list. As of 2010, the Vineyarders possess the cup, and have for the last twelve years in a row.

Under head coach Donald Herman, who took over the coaching reins in 1987, the Vineyarders football team won five Massachusetts State Championships and appeared in eight state championship games in total. He also led the Vineyarders to two undefeated seasons, in 1997 and 1999. Furthermore, they have won nine league championships under Herman's leadership. Herman has also been selected as the Boston Globe Coach of the Year on two occasions, among numerous other accolades. At the end of the 2015 season, Herman announced his retirement from the head coaching position of the football team. During his 28 years as head coach at Martha's Vineyard, Herman had a record of 216 wins and 90 losses. Former QB Randall Jette went on the play cornerback at UMass, where he was a prospect for the 2016 NFL draft.

Football accomplishments

- State champions – 1991, 1992, 1997, 1999, 2003
- State finalists – 2000, 2001, 2008
- League champions – 1973, 1991, 1992, 1997, 1999, 2000, 2001, 2002, 2003, 2008, 2023
- Undefeated seasons – 1963, 1997, 1999

=== Basketball ===
In the 1970s and 1980s, the school's boys' basketball team advanced to the state South Sectional Finals on a few occasions, once bowing 86–72 in Boston Garden to a Cathedral Latin team that featured Boston Globe All-Scholastic players Dwan Chandler, Gary Burke, and Mimi James (1976). A longtime Vineyard summer resident, Bijan C. Bayne, is writing a book about Martha's Vineyard schoolboy, schoolgirl, and summer league basketball, due out in March 2015.

The girls' basketball team achieved even greater success. They have won state championships, in 1979 and 1981, won a sectional championships, and played deep into the state tournament on numerous occasions. The girls' basketball team has produced numerous players who won all-state honors, including 1,000-point scorer Erin Hill, who was named Boston Herald First Team All-Scholastic in 2016.

=== Hockey ===
The boy's ice hockey team won the Massachusetts State Championship in 1999-2000 (Division 3), and in 2001-2002 (Division 2). The boys' hockey team is one of the most successful athletic teams at the school. Also, the girls' hockey team has become a successful program in recent times as well, qualifying for the State Tournament for the last three years, and coming within one win of a Sectional Championship. In March 2025 the Girls' hockey team was recognized by the Massachusetts Interscholastic Athletic Association (MIAA) for their sportsmanship.

=== Lacrosse ===
The boys' lacrosse team plays in EasternAC Conference, and previously played in the Maritime League. Historically, their biggest rival has been the Nantucket Whalers. They are the only high school team to bring a State Championship game to be played on the island, when in 2003 they lost to Ipswich 6–5 in the Division 3 State Championship. They won the Maritime League Championship in 2002, 2003, and 2004.

=== Other sports ===
While in the Mayflower League, the MVRHS cross country team consistently competed for the league championship. After joining the EAC, they have competed for first place against renowned powerhouse Bishop Feehan High School.

Ned Fennessy retired in June 2013, after 23 seasons as the boys' tennis varsity coach. During his career, Fennessy coached his teams to 290 victories, winning back-to-back MIAA Division 3 State Championships in his final two seasons.

Across the road from the MVRHS, the Martha's Vineyard Skatepark is open to the public, offering a range of ramps and obstacles. As of 2021, the high school does not offer a skateboarding team.

== Alumni ==
- Tim Burton, 1982, of the Mighty Mighty Bosstones
- Willy Mason, 2003, musician, songwriter, and radio talk show host
- Ryen Russillo, 1993, from the Danny Kanell Radio show on ESPN Radio 1–4 PM Monday–Friday
