= Edgartown School =

Coordinates: 41°23′23.78″N 70°31′21.94″W

Information
- Enrollment: 348
- Mascot: Eagle
- Website: www.edgartownschool.org

The Edgartown School is located on Martha's Vineyard, Massachusetts. As of 2024 enrollment for the elementary school (pre-kindergarten through grade 8) was at 386. The school mascot is the Eagle.

== Curriculum ==
This school has a well-developed enrichment program which includes NAL, The math program "EPGY", Edgartown readers, KMO, etc. and mock trial.

== Sports programs ==
In February 2006 the boys' varsity basketball team won the island championship. In 2008 the girls' softball team won the island championship.

In 2003, Edgartown School moved into a new building, replacing the old red brick one of 50 years. The two school buildings are connected by the gym. The basketball team of 2008 came in second place. The volleyball team came in first place in 2008. In 2012, the lady's basketball team claimed first place. Also, in 2013 both the girls' and the boys' basketball teams won first place in the tough championships. 2013: Edgartown Boys vs Charter Boys. In 2014 the boys' basketball team came up just short in a final against Tisbury by a score of 47-33.

== Leadership and staff ==
As of 2001, the school principal was Ed Jerome. Edgartown School alumnus John Stevens was principal at the school for 12 years, retiring in 2019 and returning as interim principal in 2024. In 2025, Kate Campbell accepted the post of principal.
