= Martha's Vineyard Magazine =

Regional magazine

Martha's Vineyard Magazine is a regional magazine covering Martha's Vineyard island. The magazine was founded by William Waterway Marks in 1985, who sold it to Vineyard Gazette, Inc. in 1990.

== About the magazine ==
Published in eight editions per year, Martha's Vineyard Magazine features in-depth articles on a range of island-related topics including local events, cuisine, music and the arts, gardening, interiors, personalities and traditions.

Martha's Vineyard Magazine was honored as a finalist for the 2010 National City and Regional Magazine Awards in three categories: General Excellence, Ancillary Publications for their Home & Garden magazine, and Leisure/Lifestyle Interests for their series on wild edibles.

It is a member of the City and Regional Magazine Association (CRMA).

== Best of the Vineyard ==
Best of the Vineyard is a contest held annually by the magazine in which readers vote for island businesses which “are the very best at what they do.”

The award is given in a variety of categories that range from necessity to luxury. Past categories include best summer event, chowder, caterer, place to get a vegetarian meal, bar/pub, yoga class, landscape company, person you'd most like to have lunch with and many more.

Many island businesses feature their selection as “Best of the Vineyard” in their advertising, and often display the framed award as a tribute to their popularity with the island community.

== Ancillary publications ==
- Home & Garden is a semiannual publication, detailing many of the Vineyard's fine homes and gardens. These issues come out twice a year, spring and fall.
- Island Weddings & Celebrations is an annual publication featuring articles on unique Vineyard weddings as well as information for brides-to-be. This issue comes out in January of each year.

== Business relationships ==
Martha's Vineyard Magazine is owned by Vineyard Gazette Incorporated.
