= Nora Groce =

British anthropologist

Nora Ellen Groce
- Education: University of Michigan; Brown University
- Occupation: Anthropologist

Nora Ellen Groce is an anthropologist, global health expert and Director of the Disability Research Centre at University College London. She is known for her work on vulnerable populations in low- and middle-income countries and in particular for her work on people with disabilities in the developing world. Her doctoral dissertation, published by Harvard University Press in 1985, Everyone Here Spoke Sign Language: Hereditary Deafness on Martha’s Vineyard, is considered a classic work in the disability studies and ethnographic literatures.

An undergraduate major in anthropology at the University of Michigan (1974), she received her PhD in medical anthropology from Brown University and then served as Research Fellow at the Harvard University Medical School from 1984 to 1990. She joined the faculty of the Yale School of Public Health from 1991 to 2008, rising to the rank of associate professor. In 2008 she left the Yale School of Public Health to take the Leonard Cheshire Chair and become director of the Leonard Cheshire Disability Research Centre at the University College of London.

Groce has undertaken applied research on subjects such as poverty and disability, domestic violence, the impact of HIV/AIDS on people with disabilities, and disabled populations’ access to health care and social justice. Among her most recent work is her publication on disabled street beggars in Ethiopia (2013), and on the emerging issue of Global disabilities for the Lancet (2018). Author of over 250 journal articles, books and reports, she is a regular adviser for UN agencies, national governments and non-governmental organisations. She sits on a number of scientific advisory panels and review boards.

Groce is also known for her teaching and mentoring. While a research scientist at Harvard she regularly taught medical anthropology and international health courses. Working with Professor Lowell Levin, she helped establish and run the Global Health Division at the Yale School of Public Health in 1991, teaching a number of courses on global health, international development and social justice.

== Notable works ==
- Groce, Nora Ellen (1985). Everyone Here Spoke Sign Language: Hereditary Deafness on Martha's Vineyard. Cambridge, MA: Harvard University Press. ISBN 0-674-27041-X. Retrieved 25 June 2015.
- Groce N. 2018. "Global Disability: An emerging issue". Lancet Global Health: 6:7:724-725
