= Spohn Ranch =

American skatepark design firm

Spohn Ranch is a skatepark design and construction firm based in Industry, California. The firm specializes in the construction and design of concrete skateparks and skate plazas, skateable art sculptures, several styles of ramps, and courses for skateboarding, BMX and motocross events.

== History ==
The company began in the 1980s when founder and president, Aaron Spohn, was living in Venice Beach, California. He and his friends would skate the streets of Venice and occasionally build makeshift ramps on the boardwalk. The City would tolerate these ramps for a few weeks at a time before tearing them out. Spohn lobbied for several years for the City of Venice Beach to build a skatepark where he and other skaters could safely and legally skate. Spohn eventually built a half-pipe in his backyard, which he named "Spohn Ranch".

Contest organizers began approaching Spohn about building ramps for their events. In the early 1990s, the ESPN television network developed the X Games annual sports event, and in 1995 Spohn designed and built courses for the inaugural event.

After a few years of working with the X-Games and the Gravity Games and Vans Triple Crown, municipalities began approaching Spohn Ranch for help with building permanent outdoor facilities. Spohn asked friends and family members to join his company to develop it into a full-time job.

Working with municipalities and groups of volunteers, Spohn Ranch worked primarily in the municipal sector, helping design and build skateparks.

The company's work presently focuses primarily on the development of concrete facilities for skateboarding, BMX bike riding and inline skating. Ramp lines make up about 10% of the company's business, while special events and commercial shoots have been reduced to about 5% of yearly revenue.

The company has also developed pre-cast concrete skate features for skatepark construction., and designed skateparks as community spaces, or "skateable art" in 2008.

== Notable parks ==
- Daybreak Sculpture Garden - South Jordan, Utah
- Ambassador Skate Plaza – Los Angeles, California
- Bethune Point Skatepark - Daytona Beach, Florida
- Possum Creek Skatepark – Gainesville, Florida
- Concrete Bowl - Guantanamo Bay Naval Base, Cuba
