= The Martha's Vineyard Times =

Weekly American newspaper

- Type: Weekly newspaper
- Format: Tabloid
- Owner: Steve Bernier
- Founder(s): Al Brickman; Robert Carroll; Fred Ferro; Allen Jones; Edward Redstone
- Founded: 1984
- Language: English
- Headquarters: 30 Beach Rd, Vineyard Haven, Massachusetts 02568; United States
- Circulation: 5,000 (as of 2023)
- ISSN: 8750-1449
- OCLC number: 11035733
- Website: mvtimes.com

The Martha's Vineyard Times is a weekly community newspaper on Martha's Vineyard, an island seven miles off the coast of southeastern Massachusetts. The Island's six towns have a total year-round population of about 21,000 and a seasonal population estimated at 100,000.

The Times print newspaper, with a weekly circulation of about 5,000, is delivered by mail and at retail locations across the Vineyard on Thursdays. The paper also publishes a five-day-a-week email newsletter with approximately 11,000 subscribers called "The Minute."

The paper's website mvtimes.com attracts more than 3.5 million unique visitors annually. For both print and web, The Times also publishes Edible Vineyard, Vineyard Visitor, Martha's Vineyard Arts & Ideas, Voices, and Vineyard Property Values.

== History ==
The Martha's Vineyard Times was founded in the spring of 1984 by five Vineyarders in the midst of great Island population growth (45% between 1970 and 1980 and a total of 160% between 1970 and 2020.) Major economic change occurred as well: personal per capita income increased more than sixfold in the same period.

In the Times' obituary for Robert "Bob" Carroll, retired Times editor Doug Cabral said that Carroll and his partners "...believed that the Vineyard needed a newspaper that would take an aggressive interest in the year-round residents and the year-round economy of the Vineyard, both of which they thought were under-represented," and in doing so took direct aim at the editorial convictions of the venerable and much admired weekly Vineyard Gazette, which was deeply committed to conservation and preservation of the Vineyard's bucolic past. The new competition was met with consternation and disdain from the Gazette's leadership.

The Times began in 1984 as a paid-subscription broadsheet newspaper but two years later switched to a free model with a tabloid-size newspaper distributed to every post office boxholder on the island. In December 2019, the paper announced readers will have to have a paid subscription for mail delivery. At that time, the Times was printing up to 15,000 copies weekly. Following the change, as of 2023, the paper had an average print circulation of approximately 5,000 copies weekly.

In 1991, The Martha's Vineyard Times was purchased by the paper's editor Doug Cabral and his wife Molly. After 23 years of ownership, the couple sold the newspaper in 2014 to Peter and Barbara Oberfest, co-publishers of the paper and part-owners since 1995. In December 2023, the paper was sold again to Steve Bernier.

== Staff and Organization ==
The Martha's Vineyard Times employs approximately 8 full-time staff members year-round, along with a number of part-time staff and freelancers. All print and web products are published by The Martha's Vineyard Times Corp., which is owned by Steve Bernier.
