= Martha's Vineyard Skatepark =

Skatepark on Martha's Vineyard, Massachusetts, U.S.

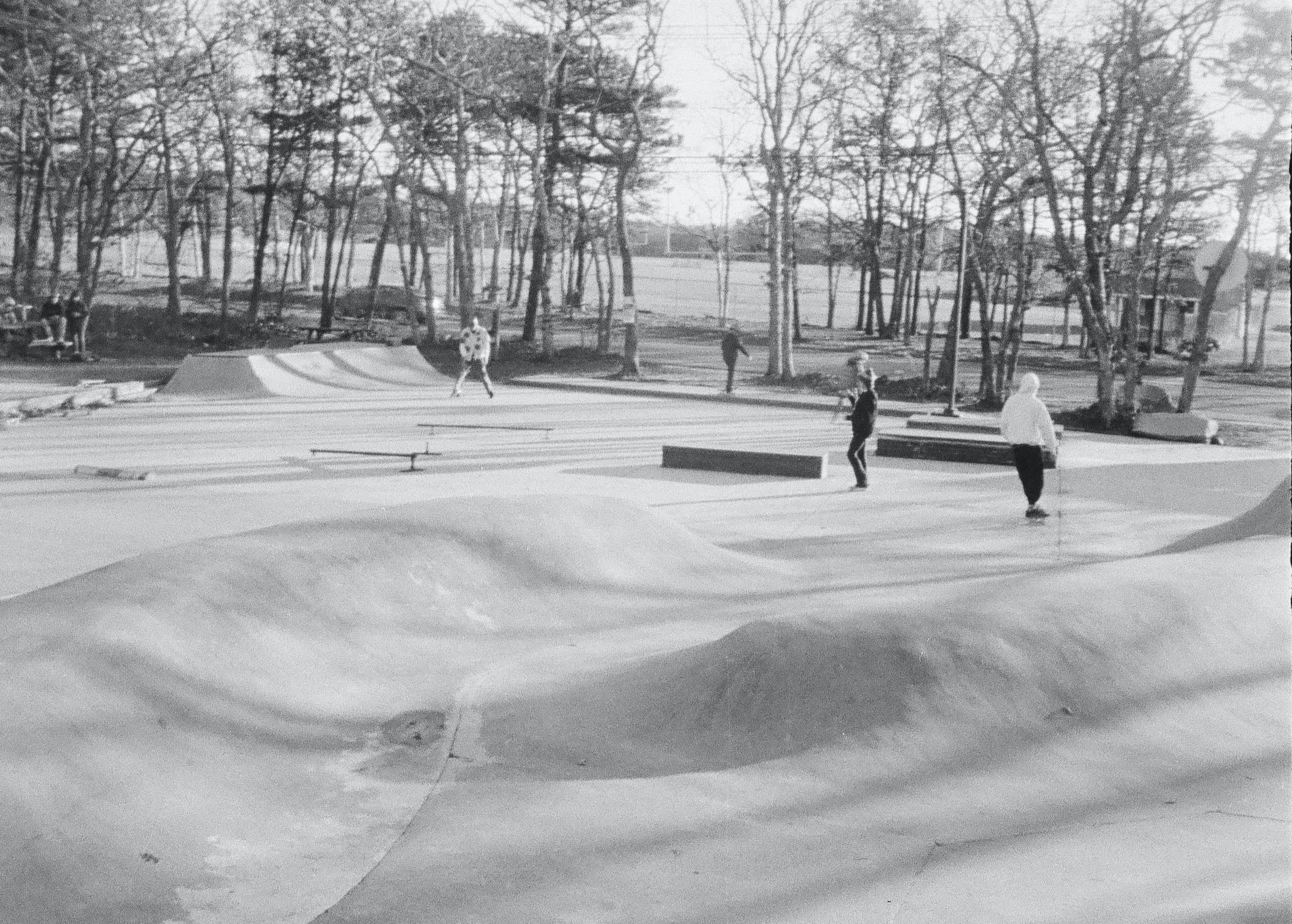
- The skatepark in 2019
- Interactive map of Martha's Vineyard Skatepark
- Type: concrete skatepark
- Location: Oak Bluffs, U.S.
- Coordinates: 41.418930500658284°N 70.5935331729746°W
- Created: 2003
- Operator: Martha's Vineyard Skatepark association

Martha's Vineyard Skatepark or MV Skatepark is a public skatepark located in the town of Oak Bluffs on Martha's Vineyard, Massachusetts.

== History ==
The campaign to build the Martha's Vineyard Skatepark began in the early 2000s, started by a group of local skaters who wanted a skatepark. The first version of the Martha's Vineyard Skatepark was constructed in 2003, featuring both concrete and wooden ramps and obstacles.

Eventually, the wooden section of the park deteriorated and was removed in 2015. The Martha's Vineyard Skatepark association, a nonprofit, 501(c)3 corporation that financed the construction of the skatepark and maintains the park, started a second capital campaign to raise money to replace the wooden section of the park with cement. Throughout its history, the association has consisted of a group of local skaters and skateboarding advocates including Richard Hammond, Nick Briggs, Erik Albert, Eliot Coutts, Elaine Barse, and others. In 2016, the skatepark association received a grant for $252,00 from MVYouth to put towards the second phase of the park. The second phase of construction was completed 2017 with skatepark design firm Spohn Ranch pouring new concrete ramps and obstacles.
