= Martha's Vineyard Transit Authority =

Bus transportation company in Massachusetts, United States

The Martha's Vineyard Regional Transit Authority

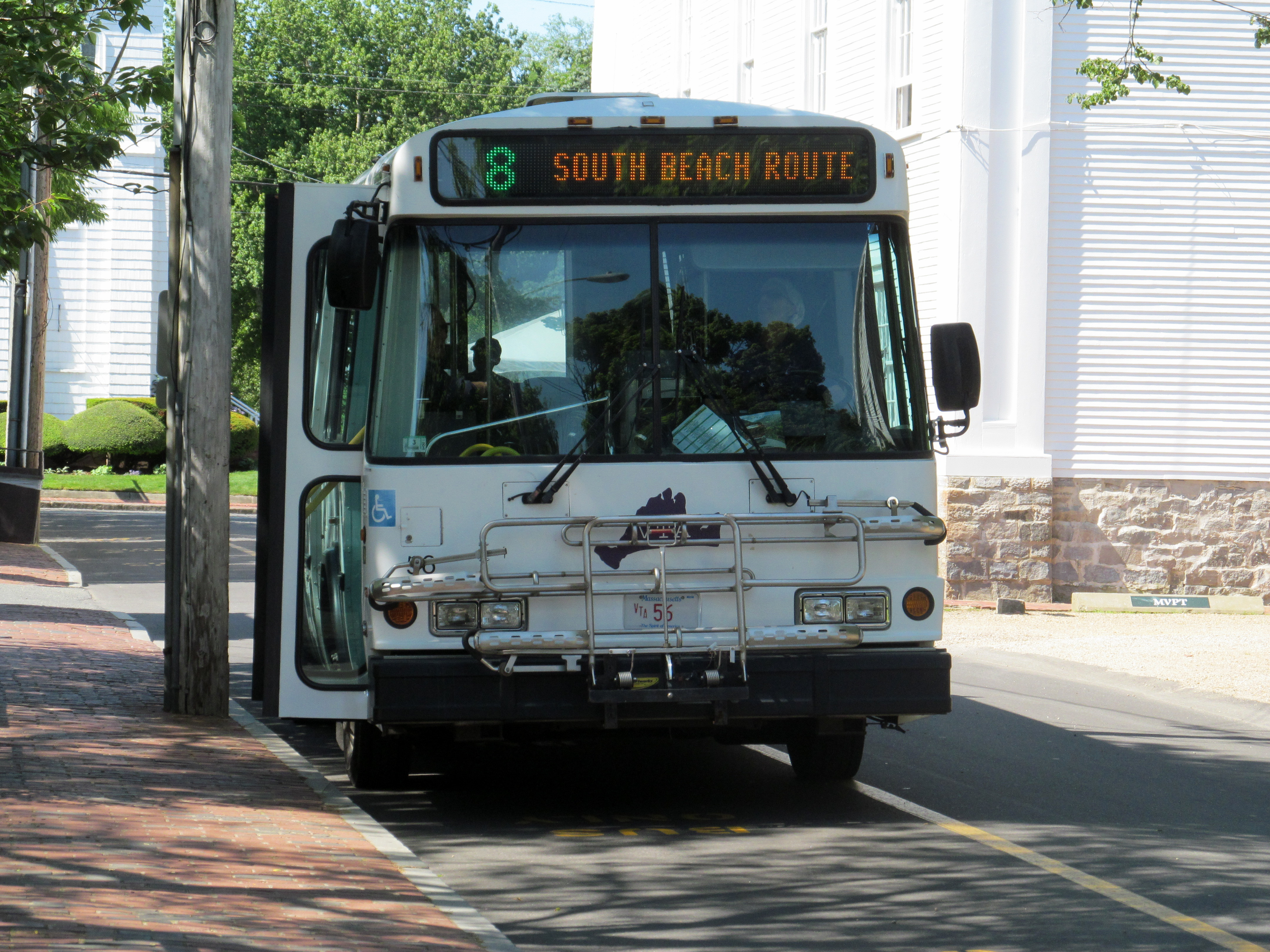
- A VTA bus in Edgartown in 2012
- Locale: Martha's Vineyard, Massachusetts
- Service type: bus service, paratransit
- Routes: 15
- Hubs: Tisbury, Edgartown, West Tisbury
- Fleet: 35 fixed-route 5 demand response (2011)
- Annual ridership: 1,347,337 (FY2018)
- Operator: Transit Connection Inc.
- Administrator: Angela Gompert
- Website: Vineyard Transit

Martha's Vineyard Transit Authority (VTA) is a bus transportation system serving Martha's Vineyard, Massachusetts. In addition to diesel buses, it has 19 electric buses charged at several points. The Edgartown facility has 700 kW solar panels and a 1.5 MWh battery adding to the bus power.

== Fares ==
All bus routes are temporarily free, as of October 15, 2025. [During the peak time of year (June 10 - October 1), The One Town fare is $2.00, and another $2.00 is added for each consecutive town. The rest of the year (off-peak), the One Town fare is $1.25, adding another $1.25 for each consecutive town. 1, 3, 7, 31 day, 100 day, as well as 365 day passes (annual) are available for purchase. Discounted fares are also available for seniors over age 65, disabled people, and military veterans. Routes 10 and 11 connect Park and Rides to city centers and so are both free.]

== Routes ==
- 1: Edgartown-Vineyard Haven Road
- 2: Vineyard Haven - West Tisbury via Lambert's Cove & Old County Roads
- 3: West Tisbury - Vineyard Haven via State Road
- 4: West Tisbury - Chilmark - Menemsha via North Road
- 5: West Tisbury - Chilmark - Aquinnah via South Road
- 6: Edgartown - Airport - West Tisbury
- 7: Oak Bluffs - Airport via County & Barnes Roads
- 8: South Beach
- 9: Oak Bluffs - Hospital - Airport via Barnes Road & County Road
- 10: Tisbury Park & Ride
- 10A: West Chop Loop
- 11: Downtown Edgartown
- 12: Chilmark In-Town\ Menemsha Sunset Bus
- 13: Edgartown - Oak Bluffs - Vineyard Haven via Beach Road
- 14: Meshacket Loop

== Ridership ==
The annual ridership in the fiscal year of 2018 was 1,347,337.

- The busiest bus route is #13, (512,914 as of CY2019) which experiences high levels of ridership during peak hours.
- The busiest bus route during the off-peak season is #1.
- Route #8 has a seasonal ridership of 26,520, far above all the seasonal routes, because of the beaches that it serves that are popular in the summer.
