= Martha's Vineyard International Film Festival =

The Martha's Vineyard International Film Festival was founded in 2006 by the Martha's Vineyard Film Society and is held annually in early September. The International Film Festival is produced by the Martha's Vineyard Film Society, a 503 c3 non-profit corporation.

The recurring theme of the annual Martha's Vineyard International Film Festival is "Other Places"; the festival's purpose is to encourage attendees to think broadly (about how huge the world of film is) and deeply (about the universal concerns and desires that unite all people). About 90% of all film selections are world cinema, helping to fulfill the festival mission of promoting cross-cultural understanding through film.

The Martha’s Vineyard International Film Festival presents a selection of world cinema feature and short films that are curated from festivals such as Berlin, Toronto, Sundance, Cannes Film Festivals, with a few undiscovered gems thrown in.

The movies are followed by post “conversations” that bring together guests from film, media, and art to discuss and debate with the audience the issues, cultural idiosyncrasies, and triumphs of the cultures revealed by the extraordinary series of films.

The entertainment continues right outside the screening venues in downtown Vineyard Haven in the festival’s “Walking Festival District”, with local shops and restaurants hosting special events, cocktail parties, artist showcases, live music and more.

== 2010 Festival Highlights ==
The 2010 festival's new Global Citizen Award, went to veteran actor and activist Matthew Modine for his long-term dedicated to environmental challenges. One of Modine’s many accomplishments was the creation of Bicycle for a Day, which promotes bicycling as an alternative to driving in order to both cut pollution and promote healthier living.

Another event that drew record crowds was the new, jury-judged, short film competition. An expert panel chose NYU student: Luke Matheny’s "GOD OF LOVE" as winner over nearly 200 other entries. The audiences response agreed with the selection made by the jury. Mr. Matheny received a $500 cash award for Best Short Film.

24 features and 30 short films were screened during this four-day festival. Most were introduced by special guests, such as comic veteran writer Marty Nadler, entomologist Paul Goldstein, Adam Brown, New York Times correspondent and Middle East expert Steven Kinzer, filmmaker and Vineyard resident, Victoria Campbell, author Kate Feiffer, local NPR host Mindy Todd, and Plum TV host Sissy Biggers.,

== Independent References ==
Actor Matthew Modine Headlines 5th International Film Festival

Matthew Modine and a cool cow

Martha's Vineyard International Film Festival is a wrap

Festival draws foreign film buffs

Martha's Vineyard film festival has foreign accent

Martha's Vineyard International Film Festival this weekend

For Richard Paradise, Vineyard film fest director, festival also a community event
