= Vineyard Gazette =

Weekly Newspaper on the island of Martha's Vineyard

- Type: Weekly newspaper
- Format: Broadsheet
- Owner: The Martha's Vineyard Gazette LLC
- Founder: Edgar Marchant
- Publisher: Monica Brady-Myerov
- Editor: Bill Eville
- Managing editor: Ethan Genter
- Founded: May 14, 1846
- Language: English
- Headquarters: Edgartown, Massachusetts
- Country: United States
- Circulation: 8,009 (as of 2014)
- OCLC number: 9397107
- Website: vineyardgazette.com

The Vineyard Gazette is one of two paid circulation newspapers on the island of Martha's Vineyard. Founded in 1846, it also circulates in many other states and countries to seasonal residents of the resort island.

== History ==
The Gazette was founded by editor Edgar Marchant and first published on Thursday, May 14, 1846. In the pages of the Gazette, Marchant advocated that to supplement native industries the island should market itself as a "Watering-Place in the Summer Season" and the island later became a summer resort destination. Charles Marchant, the son of Edgar Marchant's cousin Charles, assumed editorship in 1888 and retired in 1920. The newspaper remained in the Marchant family, save for two short interruptions, until 1920.

The newspaper was purchased in 1920 by George A. Hough of the New Bedford Standard, as a wedding present for his son Henry Beetle Hough and Henry's new wife Elizabeth Bowie Hough. Henry Hough had won a special Pulitzer Prize for historical research as a Columbia University student in 1918. Hough spent the rest of his life at the Gazette, becoming a celebrated "country editor", and his wife was his co-editor and collaborator at the Gazette until her death in 1965. By Henry Hough's death, the circulation of the newspaper had increased from 600 to 13,000. The Houghs and the Gazette were strong advocates against development and the Houghs donated land they owned for preservation, founding the Sheriff's Meadow Foundation to preserve it and other natural areas on the island.

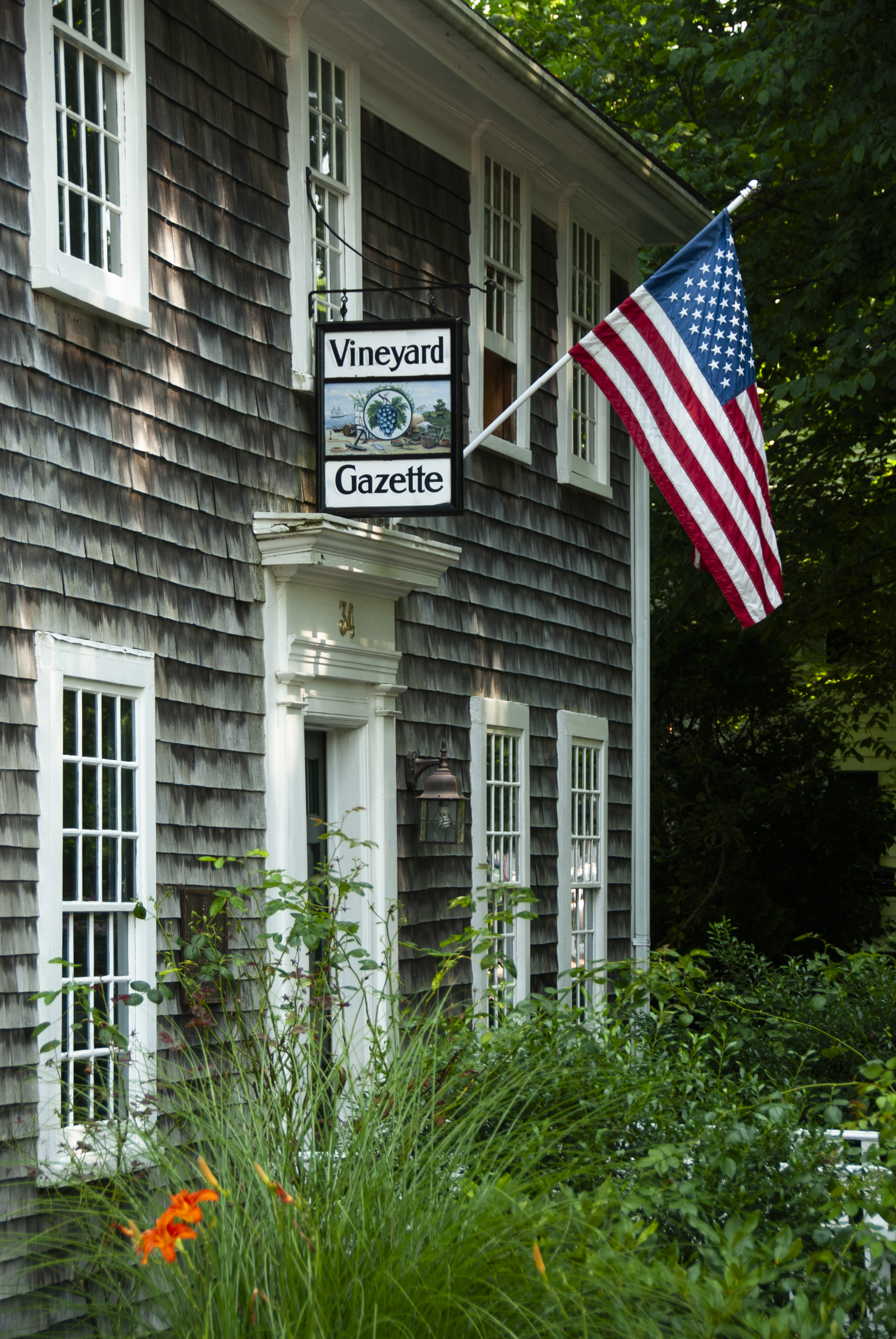
Gazette offices in Edgartown

In 1968, Henry Hough sold the newspaper to James Reston, two-time Pulitzer winner and long-time journalist and editor at the New York Times, who managed it with his wife Sally Reston. Hough sought out Reston, telling him "I want it to go into a newspaper family and you have writing sons." Hough continued to write for the newspaper until his death in 1985. In 1975, one of Reston's writing sons, Richard Reston, an experienced foreign correspondent and bureau chief with the Los Angeles Times, took over operations of the paper in conjunction with his wife Mary Jo Reston, and they assumed the title of publisher from the senior Restons in 1988. Under the Restons, circulation increased to 18,000, profits increased drastically, and the newspaper was named Newspaper of the Year eight times by the New England Press Association. The newspaper was a finalist for the Pulitzer Prize for Spot News Reporting for their coverage of 1991's Hurricane Bob. Like Henry Hough, Richard Reston was a strong editorial advocate against development and for environmental preservation, and is credited with many victories in those areas. These stances prompted five local business owners to start a competing newspaper, the Martha's Vineyard Times, in 1984.

Mary Jo Reston retired in 1999, Richard Reston in 2003. Richard Reston was succeeded by John W. Walter, an editor of USAToday and the Atlanta Journal-Constitution. In 2011, the newspaper was purchased by businessman Jerome Kohlberg, Jr. and his wife Nancy Kohlberg. They appointed Jane Seagrave, a former Associated Press executive, publisher in April 2011.
