= Aquinnah Cultural Center =

Massachusetts museum dedicated to Aquinnah Wampanoag history and culture

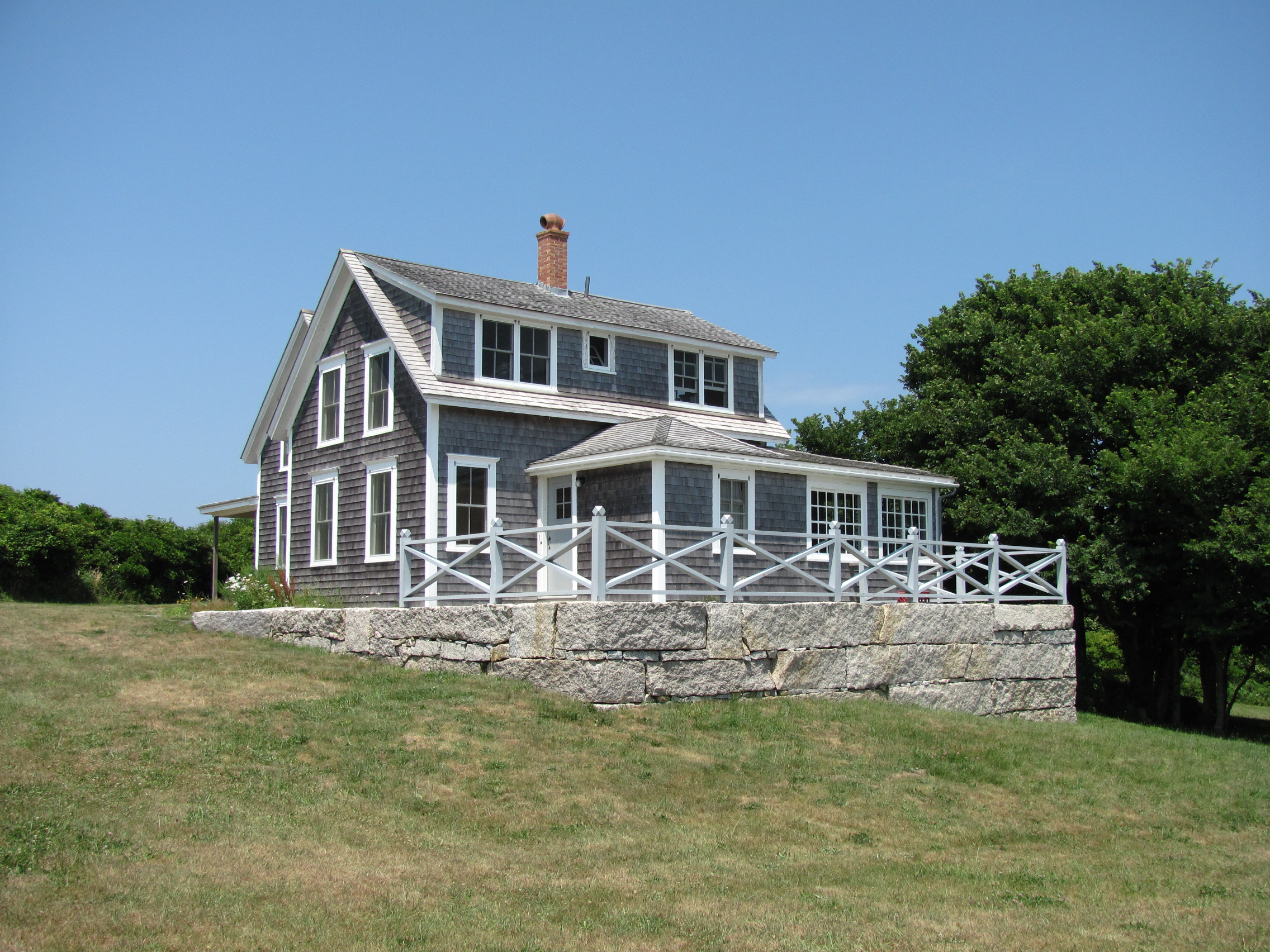
- Established: 1998
- Location: 35 Aquinnah Circle; Aquinnah, MA 02535 United States
- Coordinates: 41.34619°N 70.83569°W
- Type: History
- Website: Aquinnah Cultural Center. Martha's Vineyard Museum

Aquinnah Cultural Center (ACC) is a non-profit museum and education center, based in Aquinnah, Massachusetts, dedicated to preserving and promoting Aquinnah Wampanoag history, culture and contributions on Martha’s Vineyard.

== History ==
Aquinnah Cultural Center was founded in 1998. In 2006, the Edwin DeVries Vanderhoop Homestead, a historic homestead built in 1890 by a Wampanoag-Surinamese American Edwin DeVries Vanderhoop, was restored and reopened as the Aquinnah Cultural Center.

The ACC is located near the Gay Head lighthouse.

The Aquinnah Cultural Center is the home of the Aquinnah Wampanoag Museum. Past exhibits at the Aquinnah Wampanoag Museum include "The Traditional Art of Weaving," "The Wampanoag Story," "Generations," "Seals and Society," and "Wampum: Stories from the Shells of Native America."

== Mission ==
The Aquinnah Cultural Center's mission is to preserve, educated, and document the Aquinnah Wampanoag self-defined art, history, culture and contributions of the past, present and future. The organization maintains a digital database of Aquinnah Wampanoag oral histories. This database is only available to tribal members.

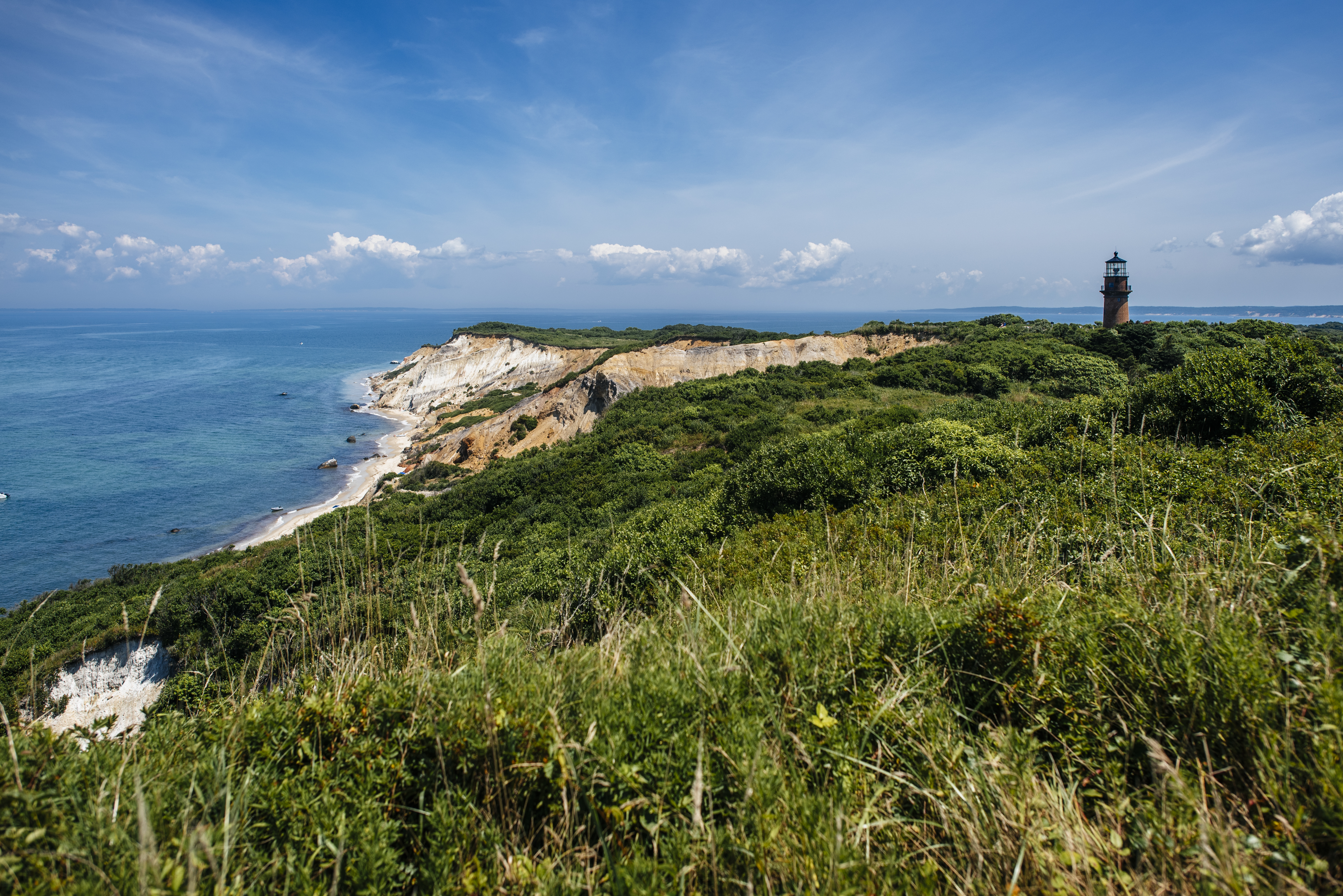
The Aquinnah Cultural Center sits on the Gay Head Cliffs, neighboring the Gay Head Light

The Aquinnah Cultural Center hosts regular Cultural Night events for tribal families and an annual Artisan Market showcasing Native artists.
