= Helen Manning =

Native American writer from Maine (1919–2008)

- Born: Helen Edith Vanderhoop; September 24, 1919
- Died: January 25, 2008 (aged 89)
- Citizenship: Wampanoag Tribe of Gay Head (Aquinnah) and U.S.
- Occupations: Writer, education director, activist, historian
- Relatives: Amos Smalley; Edwin DeVries Vanderhoop

Helen Edith Vanderhoop Manning Murray (September 24, 1919 – January 25, 2008) was a Native American historian and writer and enrolled citizen of the Aquinnah Wampanoag Tribe. She is known for her book Moshup's Footsteps: The Wampanoag Nation, Gay Head/Aquinnah: the People of First Light (2001), as a tribal elder, and as serving as education director for her tribe.

== Early life ==
Manning was born on September 24, 1919, in Gay Head to her mother Evelyn Magretta (née Moss) and father Arthur Herbert Vanderhoop. An only child, Manning spent her summers at Gay Head while attending school in Washington, D.C. From the age of seven, she lived with her maternal grandmother Lavina Moss, aunt Edith Moss, and uncle Berry Armstrong Claytor during the school year in order to gain a higher level of education than she would at Gay Head. Manning was of both African-American and Wampanoag ancestry.

== Career ==
In the 1950s and 1960s, Manning was the schoolteacher in Gay Head. In 1968 she became a special education teacher at Oak Bluffs School, and remained in that post until 1984. She was a teacher for 35 years, of which 12 were at the Gay Head schoolhouse. The schoolhouse closed in 1968, at which point there were five children attending. Manning is remembered as a teacher "who did not limit her teachings to the inside of those four walls. There were lessons learned under the Gay Head Cliffs from a fistful of clay; in the bogs gathering fat, red cranberries; and in preparing for the annual Gay Head Pageant".

Manning was the director of education for the Wampanoag Tribe of Gay Head. As part of this position, she served on committees including human services, health, hospitality and Christiantown museum. On the Aquinnah Cultural Board, she was a part of the community service programs. She represented her people on the Massachusetts Commission on Indian Affairs, and was treasurer of the Aquinnah Cultural Center. She chaperoned the American Indian Youth Summit taking place in D.C. during 1998, 1999, and 2001. She worked on an oral history project.

With Jessie Little Doe Baird, Manning founded the Wôpanâak Language Reclamation Project, and was its co-director with Baird.

From 1972 for 16 years Manning served as director on the Wampanoag Tribal Council. She fought for federal recognition of her tribe, which was achieved in April 1987. Manning then became the tribal council secretary. In November 1974 she was elected to the Martha's Vineyard Commission. She received the most votes throughout the island, bringing in 2,161 votes. Manning was involved in litigation over land claims. She described some of the area's landmarks as "vital and spiritual parts of the Tribal history of the Gay Head Indians".

From 1976 to 1979 Manning was the Gay Head selectman, on the Aquinnah Cultural Council and Philbin scholarship committee, as well as being the library trustee for more than 20 years.

Manning retired as the director of education for the Wampanoag Tribe of Gay Head in 1996.

== Personal life ==
While working at Fisk University, Manning met Joseph Murray, who was attending dental school in the same area. Shortly after the meeting in July 1946 the two married and lived in Washington until 1953. At that time, Joseph was deployed to Korea as part of the army. After returning home from overseas, the couple divorced. In 1961, Manning married James Manning, and become a stepmother to his three daughters. James Manning was also a member of the Wampanoag Tribe of Gay Head. The two, along with James's parents (Captain Walter Manning and Ada), opened a family restaurant, a gift shop, Manning's Snack Bar, and cottages near the town's lighthouse. James Manning died in 1974, leaving Manning as a widow and closing down the family restaurant. In 2002, Manning and her first husband, Joseph Murray, remarried, and lived in Washington D.C.
