= Edwin DeVries Vanderhoop Homestead =

Historic house in Massachusetts, United States

- U.S. National Register of Historic Places
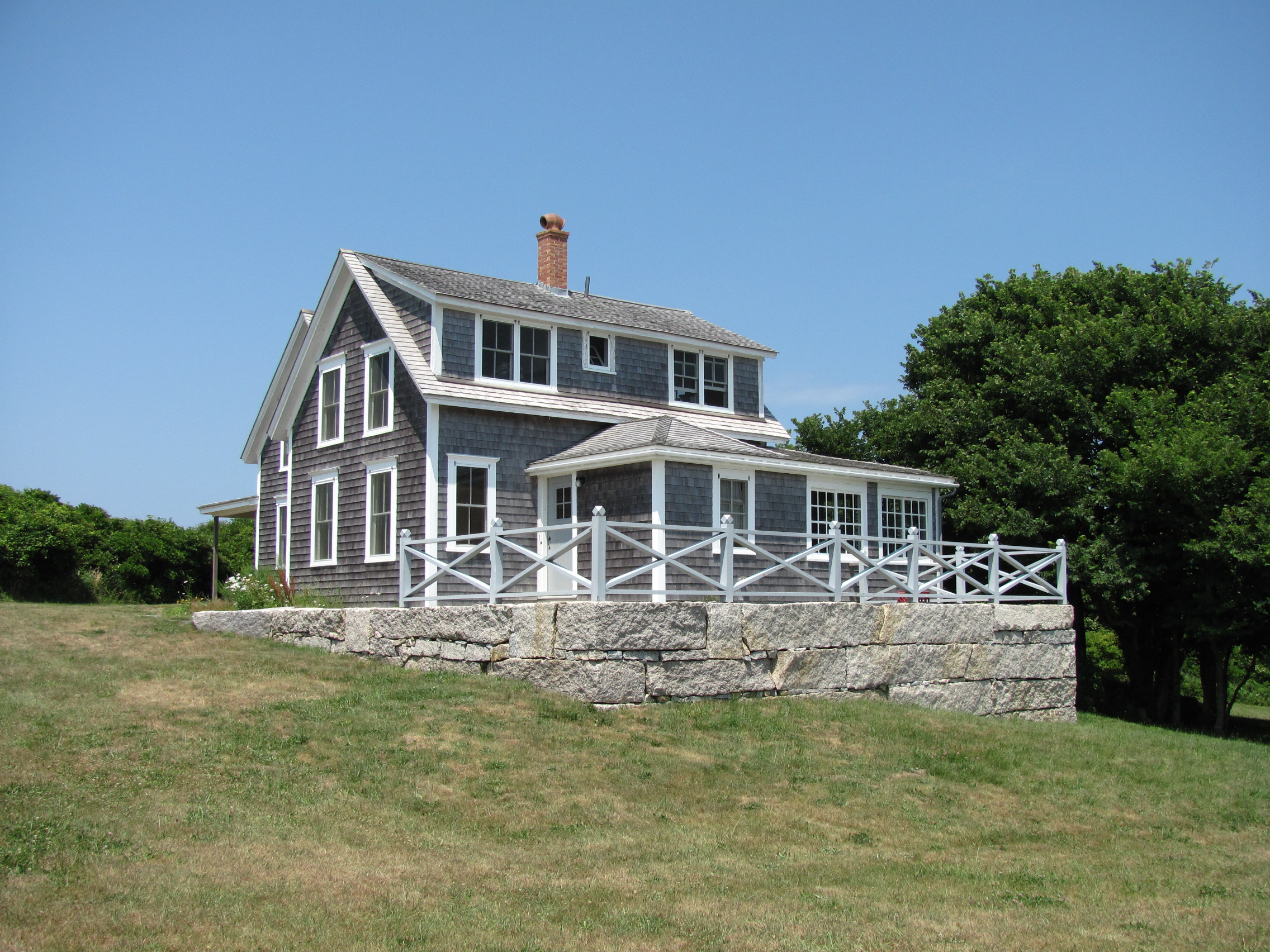

- Location within Massachusetts Location within the United States
- Location: Aquinnah, Massachusetts
- Coordinates: 41°20′43″N 70°50′9″W
- Built: 1890
- NRHP reference No.: 06000784
- Added to NRHP: September 6, 2006

The Edwin DeVries Vanderhoop Homestead, is an historic house at 35 South Road, Aquinnah, Massachusetts, United States. The c. 1890s house is the first built by a member of the Vanderhoop family, which is prominent in the town politics of Aquinnah and in the tribal organization of the Wampanoag Tribe of Gay Head. The house was listed on the National Register of Historic Places in 2006.

It is now operated as a museum called the Aquinnah Cultural Center and features exhibits on tribal history and culture.

== History ==
William Adrian Vanderhoop (b. 1816) was the first member of the Vanderhoop family to move to what is now Aquinnah, Massachusetts on the island of Martha's Vineyard, but was then a reservation of the Wampanoags of Gay Head. In 1837, he married a Wampanoag woman and raised a large family, whose descendants continue to be prominent in the affairs of the town and tribe. In 1869, the Commonwealth of Massachusetts began the process of incorporating the town of Gay Head (as Aquinnah was called before 1998) by dividing the tribal lands among its members. Vanderhoop purchased one of the tracts defined by the state from a tribal member in 1890 for $40, and immediately signed it over to his son, Edwin DeVries Vanderhoop. He was a whaling captain, and the first Wampanoag to sit in the state legislature.

Sometime between 1890 and 1897 the younger Vanderhoop constructed a house on the property. With only modest changes to its structure, and the addition and loss of outbuildings on the property, it has retained its original character. The house was acquired by the Town of Aquinnah and is the home of the non-profit Aquinnah Cultural Center, and has been converted into a cultural center and museum. Most of the land owned by Vanderhoops was acquired by the Martha's Vineyard Land Bank at the same time.

== Description ==
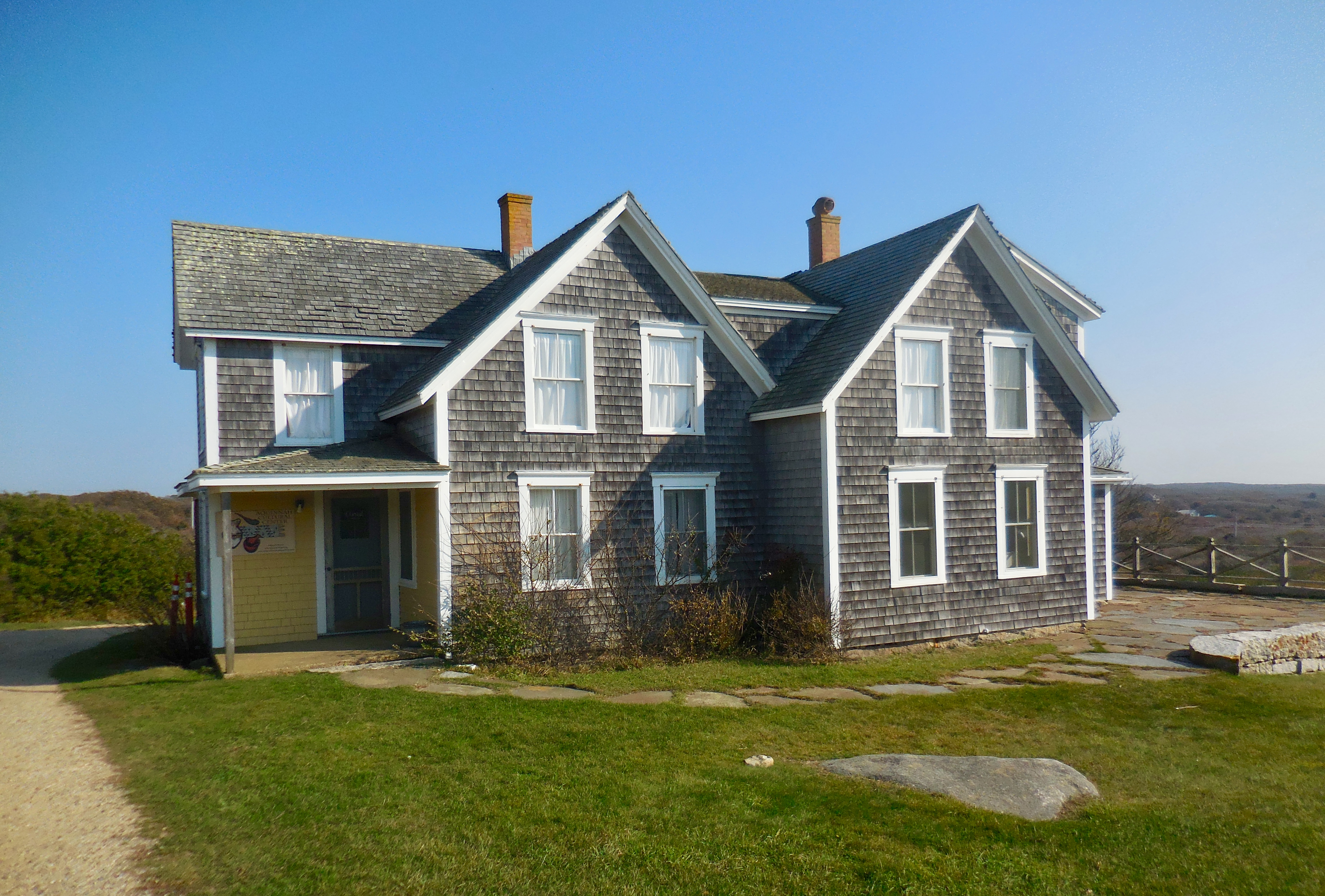
View of the house showing the two Cape style sections.

The house is located on a windswept tract on the far west side of Gay Head, about one mile (1.6 km) west of the town center of Aquinnah. It marks the western end of South Road, the main road connecting Aquinnah to the rest of Martha's Vineyard. There are currently no outbuildings, although there had been in the past. The historic tract extends down to Rhode Island Sound, with expansive views of the ocean.

The house sits near the road at a location that begins to drop off sharply toward the coast. The main body of the house consists of two large Cape style sections whose ridge lines run east–west, but at an offset from each other. Each section has a central chimney. The two sections appear to have been constructed relatively near each other in time, since the construction methods appear to be similar. It is possible that one of the two sections was built before 1890 and moved to the site.

The north block of the house measures 24' by 16', with three window bays on the long dimension and two on the short. A two-story entry block projects from the center of the north elevation, and is flanked by porches. The main north block is offset by 5 feet (1.5 m) from the south block, which measures 22' by 16', and has a single-story block protruding from the center of its south elevation.

Inside the house, the northern section contains a living room and parlor, while the southern section houses the kitchen, pantry, and dining room. Four bedrooms and a bathroom occupy the second floor. The walls and ceilings are plaster throughout the house, and the floors are painted pine. Modifications to the first floor have been limited: a fireplace was added to the living room, and doorways have been widened between the entry and living room, and between the living and dining rooms.

== See also ==
- National Register of Historic Places listings in Dukes County, Massachusetts
