= Edwin DeVries Vanderhoop =

Native American whaleman, politician, & Civil War veteran

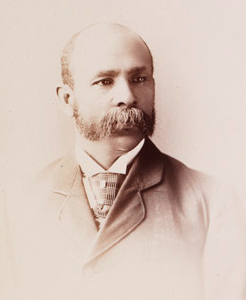
- Born: Edwin DeVries Vanderhoop; December 12, 1848; Gay Head, now Aquinnah, Massachusetts, U.S.
- Died: January 28, 1923 (aged 74)
- Resting place: Aquinnah Town Cemetery
- Education: Wayland Seminary
- Occupations: Politician, soldier, teacher, whaleman, fishermen, proprietor
- Spouse: Mary Amelia Hollensworth Cleggett Vanderhoop
- Children: 7: (Nanetta, Anna, Pauline, Edwin P., David F., Leonard F., William D.)
- Parents: William Adrian Vanderhoop (father); Beulah Oocouch Saulsbury (mother)
- Relatives: Helen Vanderhoop Manning

Edwin DeVries Vanderhoop (1847 – 1923) was an American Civil War veteran, politician, fishermen, hotel proprietor, and whaleman of Wampanoag Native American and Dutch Surinamese descent. He was born in Gay Head, Massachusetts (since re-named Aquinnah under Wampanoag name restoration efforts).

== Early life ==
Born in 1848, the son of Afro-Dutch Surinamese whaler William Adrian Vanderhoop and his Wampanoag wife Beulah Oocouch Saulsbury, Edwin grew up in Gay Head, Massachusetts with 8 brothers and sisters.

== Career ==
At the age of 16, Edwin joined the Union army naval division. Stationed on the USS Mahaska during the Civil War, Edwin D. Vanderhoop blocked shipments of British goods to the South.

=== Wayland Seminary and Mary Cleggett ===
After the confederacy’s surrender, Edwin briefly worked on whaleboats out of New Bedford. After Whaling, Vanderhoop headed to Wayland Seminary in Washington, DC, graduating in 1878. After Wayland, Edwin traveled to Pine Buff, Ark. to teach, most likely at the Branch Normal School, a college a product of the Morrill Act of 1862 and which is now the University of Arkansas at Pine Bluff. Vanderhoop's sister Anna, who also taught there, died in 1881 of “brain fever.”

At Pine Bluff, Edwin met Mary Amelia Cleggett, who also a taught there. Mary was the daughter of William S. Cleggett, a free black man and his wife Rebecca Hollensworth.

Edwin and Mary married in March 1883 at Pine Bluff. Their first child, Nannetta, was born in 1884.

In 1885, Edwin and Mary, decided to return to the birthplace of Edwin to raise their family and contribute to the political, social and economic life of the newly federally recognized (1870) town of Gay Head.

=== Politics and return to Gay Head ===
In 1887, Edwin Vanderhoop, in a celebrated political campaign, became the county commissioner of Dukes County, elected as a Republican representative in the state legislature, becoming the first Wampanoag to sit in the Legislature. In addition to politics, Vanderhoop was a hotel proprietor, running a hotel he built called the Aquinnah House. This nineteenroom hotel, located on a hill overlooking the ocean, accommodated visitors arriving via steam boat. After a while, the strong weather of the cliffs pushed it into disrepair and the house became known as the “Haunted House.”

In 1892, Vanderhoop was also listed as the clay agent for the town. In 1893, the clay from the Gay Head Cliffs was leased to the Gay Head Clay Company for $500 per year, with the clay to be shipped to kilns for brick manufacture.

In 1907, he was one of three Selectmen, Assessors and Overseers of the Poor. with Francis Manning and Linus S. Jeffers.

Later in life, he was appointed Minister to Haiti by President Harrison.

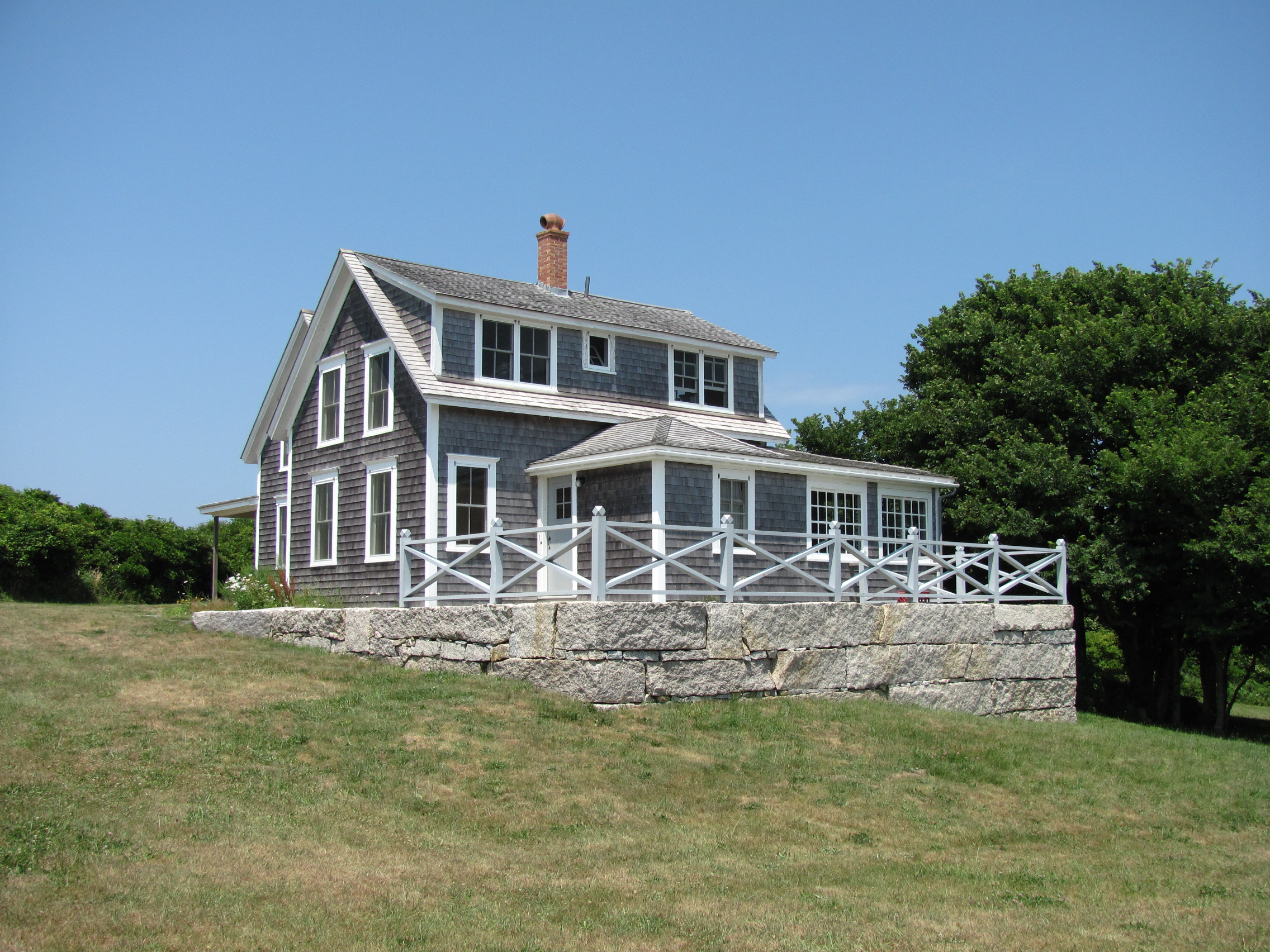
Edwin DeVries Vanderhoop Homestead, Aquinnah, MA

== Edwin DeVries Vanderhoop Homestead ==
In 1869 the Commonwealth of Massachusetts began the process of incorporating the town of Gay Head (as Aquinnah was called before 1998) by dividing the tribal lands among its members. Adrian Vanderhoop, Edwin's father, purchased one of the tracts defined by the state from tribal member William Morton in 1890 for $40, and immediately signed it over to his son. The other part Edwin received in the set off. Sometime between 1890 and 1897, Edwin Vanderhoop and family constructed a house on the property.

The house was listed on the National Register of Historic Places in 2006.

It is now operated as a museum called the Aquinnah Cultural Center and features exhibits on Wampanoag tribal history and culture.
