= Mahaska =

Mahaska may refer to:

- Mahaska (c. 1784–1834), a chief of the Native American Iowa tribe
- Mahaska, son of Mahaska, better known as Francis White Cloud (d. 1859)
- Mahaska, Kansas, United States
- Mahaska County, Iowa, United States
- USS Mahaska
