= Wampanoag Tribe of Gay Head =

Federally recognized tribe of Wampanoag people located in Massachusetts, USA

Wampanoag Tribe of Aquinnah
Âhqunah Wôpanâak
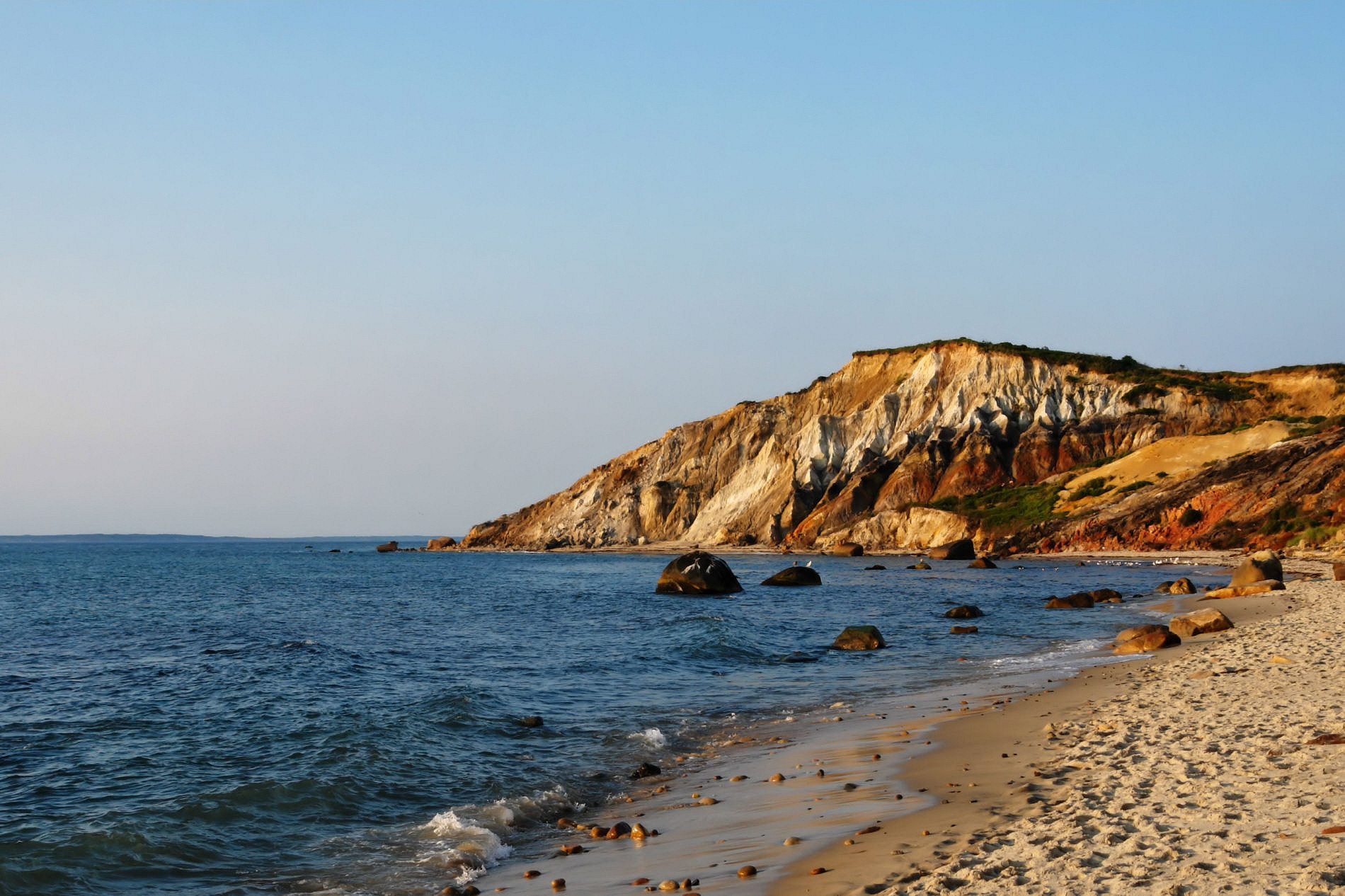
- Gay Head Cliffs, Aquinnah, Martha's Vineyard

Total population
- 901

Regions with significant populations
- United States (Massachusetts)

Languages
- English, Wampanoag

Religion
- traditional tribal religion

Related ethnic groups
- other Wampanoag people, Narragansett people

Location of the land holdings of the Wampanoag Tribe of Gay Head

The Wampanoag Tribe of Gay Head (Aquinnah) (Wampanoag: Âhqunah Wôpanâak) is a federally recognized tribe of Wampanoag people based in the town of Aquinnah on the southwest tip of Martha's Vineyard (Wampanoag: Noepe, the land amid the streams) in Massachusetts (Wampanoag: Mâsach8sut), United States.

The tribe received official recognition in 1987, the same year that their land claim on Martha's Vineyard was settled by an act of Congress, with agreement by the state and the United States Department of Interior. The government took into trust on behalf of the tribe 485 acres of Tribal Lands purchased (160 acres private and approximately 325 acres common lands).

== Government and area of residence ==
The Wampanoag Tribe of Gay Head is governed by an elected eleven-member council. The administration as of September 2026 is as follows.

- Chairman: Kevin DeVine
- Vice-chairman: Alvin Clark Jr.
- Treasurer: Durwood Vanderhoop
- Secretary: Tobias Vanderhoop
- Council: Linda Coombs
- Council: Camille Madison
- Council: Paul Jeffers-Mayhew
- Council: Steven Craddock
- Council: Janette Vanderhoop
- Council: NaDaizja Bolling
- Council: Amira Madison
- Honorary Tribal Chief: F. Ryan Malonson
- Honorary Tribal Medicine Man: Jason Baird

The tribe's honorary tribal chief and the medicine man are hereditary positions held for life.

=== Placenames in area of residence ===
The Wampanoag Tribe of Gay Head refers to its area of residence as Noepe. Local placenames are as follows:

- Kehtashimet (Lake Tashmoo in Vineyard Haven): Place of a great spring
- Kuppiauk (Area of Tisbury Great Pond): Heavily-wooded expanse of land
- Massapootoeauke (near Quansoo): Land of great blowing [whales]
- Msquepunauket (Squibnocket): At the place of the red cliff or bank
- Nashawahkamuk (Chilmark): Between the land (common land for hunting)
- Nunnepog: A pond (body of unsalted water); literally means "when there is water there"
- Sanchiacantacket (Sengekontacket): Place where the brook flows into the river
- Taakemmy (West Tisbury): Where he or she strikes it (corn processing place)
- Tchepiaquidenet (Chappaquiddick): Place of separate island
- Waskosim (North Road): New stone
- Winnetukqet (Edgartown Great Pond): Place of good river

== Economic development ==
The Aquinnah Wampanoag tribe operates a shellfish hatchery on Menemsha Pond, cultivating oysters. Tourism is also very important to the tribe. Aquinnah circle has been deemed a cultural and historical site by the Massachusetts Cultural Council and is the first town-tribe partnership in the nation. The town of Aquinnah owns the publicly accessible land atop the cliffs, but the tribe has right of refusal for all lease agreements.

In 2011, the state of Massachusetts passed a law allowing legalized gambling, and federally recognized Native American tribes began to develop proposals to develop casinos.

Faced with state opposition to a Class III facility on its land, in 2013 the Wampanoag Tribe of Gay Head proposed a Class II facility to be developed on its property. The state and town filed suit against it in federal district court, and the judge ruled in their favor. The tribe, together with the Department of Interior, appealed to the US Court of Appeals, First Circuit, defending its case in December 2016.

Many tribal members own their own businesses, while others have had to move off island for employment.

== History and origins ==
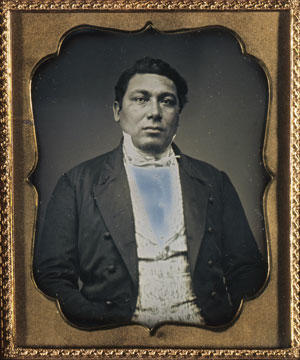
Amos Haskins, an Aquinnah Wampanoag whaling captain, master of the Massasoit, 1851

Wampanoag people have lived in the area of Aquinnah, Massachusetts, for millennia on the island of Noepe. Traditional Wampanoag legend states that Moshup, a giant, created Noepe. When walking across the mainland he grew tired, dragging his feet. The trench he created with his foot filled up with water, separating the island from the mainland. The first Wampanoag arrived on the island and discovered the island was inhabited by Moshup and his wife, Squant. Traditionally, they fished, grew crops, and hunted whales. Moshup provided the Wampanoag with food and general knowledge of the land, living side by side. Squant's moods controlled the presence of a great storm. The yearly custom among the Wampanoag was to hold a meeting to decide where they would plant. The Wampanoag women planted the "three sisters," corn, bean, and squash. Once the European settlers arrived, Moshup left the island. As he left, he threw a whale against the cliffs in anger which resulted in the eroded appearance seen today.

In 1611, Captain Edward Harlow arrived to Noepe and kidnapped a Wampanoag named Epenow, bringing him back to London. Epenow devised an escape plan, telling his captors of gold on the Island. A British expedition returned to Noepe in search of these riches – with Epenow leading the way. When the ship was close to the shore, Epenow dove into the water and swam to safety.

In 1641, Thomas Mayhew Sr. acquired the land from a sachem named Tawanquatuck. English people began settling in the region in large numbers by the 17th and 18th centuries. A year later, Puritan preacher Thomas Mayhew Jr. arrived. He aimed to convert the Wampanoags to Christianity. Hiacoome is believed to be the first Wampanoag to convert to Christianity in 1643, eventually helping Thomas Mayhew Jr convert more members of the tribe. Hiacoome eventually became ordained and the pastor of the Meeting House. Interactions between the Wampanoag and the English often led to violence, resulting in the abduction of Wampanoags, followed by tribal retaliation. Over time, the Wampanoag were dispossessed of the land, and disease epidemics decreased the Indigenous population by about half.

Some Wampanoags intermarried with English colonists and later European-American generations. As the Wampanoag had a matrilineal kinship system, they considered all children born to their women to be Wampanoag. Descent and inheritance passed through the women's lines.

Intermarriage between Black Americans and Native Americans was common in Massachusetts as early as the 17th century. A 1792 census of Wampanoag people at Gay Head showed that 28% of the tribe had African ancestry. While many Wampanoags with African ancestry tried to distinguish themselves from the Black population, this did not always succeed from the perspective of the white population. People of mixed Black and Wampanoag ancestry were generally accepted as Wampanoag by the tribe as long as they remained on Martha's Vinyard. Black Wampanoags who moved away from the community could have their Native identity questioned, including by Wampanoag people. Due to intermarriage over the centuries, there are no "full-blood" Gay Head Wampanoags, as all have mixed ancestry.

In the 19th century, most Wampanoag men worked in the whaling industry onboard ships. Some advanced in rank; for instance, Amos Hoskins became master of the Massasoit in 1851.

=== 20th century ===
In 1972, the Wampanoag people on the island formed the Wampanoag Tribal Council of Gay Head, Inc. for cultural preservation and political self-determination. They filed a land claim suit in 1974, seeking to gain title to 3,000 acres of lands lost to the state and town. In the nineteenth century, these bodies had not gained federal approval through the Senate for extinguishment of Wampanoag title, as required under the 1790 Non-Intercourse Act. The Wampanoag claimed part of the public lands in the Town of Gay Head (now Aquinnah). The suit was controversial, clouding title to other lands in the town.

The U.S. federal government formally recognized the Wampanoag Tribe of Gay Head (Aquinnah) on 10 April 1987. Under the Massachusetts Indian Land Claim Settlement Act of 1987, the federal government agreed to take into trust on behalf of the tribe approximately 485 acres of tribal lands purchased (160 acres private and approximately 325 acres common lands). The Town of Aquinnah contributed some land and the state of Massachusetts contributed up to $2,250,000 to a fund so that the Wampanoag could acquire land to be held for communal purposes. Common lands include the Gay Head Cliffs, Herring Creek, and Lobsterville. The private lands are in several parcels. Other land owned by the tribe includes parcels in Christiantown and Chappaquiddick, both on the island. The settlement provides details as to responsibilities and jurisdiction.

Since that time, in 1988 U.S. Congress passed the Indian Gaming Regulatory Act, to establish a regulatory framework for gaming on Native American lands within the jurisdiction of federally recognized tribes. As required by law, the tribe soon submitted its proposed gaming ordinance to the National Indian Gaming Commission (NIGC).

Clay mining has been protected by the tribal constitution since 1995, ensuring tribal members access to the clay cliffs.

In 1998, the town name of Gay Head was corrected by the state legislature to the Wampanoag name of Aquinnah, recognizing tribal significance.

=== 21st century ===
The tribe withdrew its earlier proposed gaming ordinance, submitting an amended form in May 2013. By letter dated 23 August 2013, the Solicitor of the Department of Interior responded to an inquiry by the National Indian Gaming Commission (NIGC) and said that the Wampanoag were not prohibited by the terms of their 1987 Settlement Act from applying for approval of gaming on their lands, in accordance with state laws.

The tribe has pulled back from an earlier proposal to develop a Class III gaming casino on its land, to which the state had objected. The state said the tribe was limited to local zoning on its land based on the 1987 settlement agreement.

The state had been working to license privately developed casinos in three regions of the state. This plan included negotiating with the Mashpee Wampanoag Tribe for a casino to be developed in Taunton, Massachusetts, which the tribe had acquired. This project was challenged in federal district court by opponents in February 2016 based on language defining Indian tribes recognized by the government in the Indian Reorganization Act of 1934. It has been appealed to the U.S. Court of Appeals, First Circuit, for exploration of the definitions.

The governor and other parties opposed approving a Class III casino to be developed by the Wampanoag tribe on the Vineyard. As of 2014, the Gay Head Wampanoag proposed to adapt an existing building for a Class II boutique casino. It was challenged in federal district court in a suit by the state, joined by the Town of Aquinnah.

In June 2016 the U.S. District Court ruled against the tribe. Judge J. Dennis Saylor IV said that the tribe was subject to state and local regulation of gambling. In addition, he determined that the Wampanoag Tribe of Gay Head (Aquinnah) did not have "sufficient governmental control" over its reservation to manage a casino. "Mr. Rappaport explained that this referred to the tribe's lack of police (they have only conservation rangers), ambulance service, firefighting staff, or any jurisdiction over the behavior of nontribe members on tribal property. Should anything go wrong at the casino, the Town of Aquinnah was neither willing nor able to assume those responsibilities."

The federal government has sided with the tribe, keeping the issue alive. Saying there were "material errors" in the judge's decision, the tribe appealed the ruling to the U.S. Appeals Court, First Circuit in December 2016, with support of the US Department of Interior.

In February 2019, the tribe announced it would begin construction of the Aquinnah Cliffs Casino in March 2019. The Wampanoag Tribe of Gay Head was scheduled to proceed with construction despite opposition from the towns of Aquinnah and Chilmark, and a request from the Martha's Vineyard Commission for the Wampanoag tribe to work with the commission to "preserve the unique values of the Vineyard." The Wampanoag tribe says the commission has no jurisdiction over the project.

== Culture ==
The Aquinnah Cultural Center is a collaborative heritage preservation, operated by a nonprofit founded by tribal members. In 2006, the building was recognized for its significance in Native American history by being added to the National Register for Historic places.

Aquinnah Cultural Center Board Members:

President: Berta Welch

Vice President: Kristina Hook-Leslie

Treasurer: Beverley Wright

Secretary: Carole Vandal

Board Member: Adriana Ignacio

The Wôpanâak language has been extinct since the 1800s. A revitalization project started in 1993. Wampanoag people believe their language to be a gift from the Creator. The community continues its practice at ceremonies and during prayer.

Wampum is made from a Quahog shell and was recognized historically as a primary trade item. Wampum belts were considered sacred. Now, Wampum is commonly sold as handmade jewelry.

The tribe hosts an annual Cranberry Day celebration on the second Tuesday of October. According to Wampanoag legend, the cranberries were brought from heaven in the beak of a white dove as a gift from the Great Spirit. The berries were dropped into a bog where they flourished under the care of Granny Squanit, the woman's goddess of wild fruits and herbs. The tribe does not tamper with the bog via weeding or using fertilizer in order to leave full control to the Great Spirit. The holiday began as a week-long encampment before becoming a three-day-long festival to eventually one day. On Cranberry Day the community usually begins picking at 6:00 am and the day comes to a close with a community potluck dinner. All Wampanoag children are excused from school to participate.

There is an annual powwow celebrating Wampanoag culture, identity, and community. The powwow allows traditions to be passed on and highlights the resilience of the tribe.

== Notable Aquinnah Wampanoag people ==
- Linda Coombs, author and historian
- Elizabeth James-Perry, wampum artist and restoration ecologist
- Helen Manning, writer, education director, activist, historian
- Julia Marden, artist reviving traditional Wampanoag twining
- Gladys Widdiss, tribal elder in Aquinnah reservation
- Edwin DeVries Vanderhoop, trader, whaler, teacher, and Civil War veteran
- Caleb Cheeshahteaumuck, first American Indian to attend Harvard University

== See also ==
- Native American tribes in Massachusetts
