= USS Mahaska =

USS Mahaska may refer to the following ships of the United States Navy:

- USS Mahaska (1861) was a wooden, double-ender, sidewheel steamer, launched in 1861 and sold in 1868.
- USS Mahaska (YN-36) was a yard tug, purchased in 1940 and served until at least 1969.
