= Aquinnah, Massachusetts =

Aquinnah, Massachusetts Âhqunah
- Town
- Town of Aquinnah
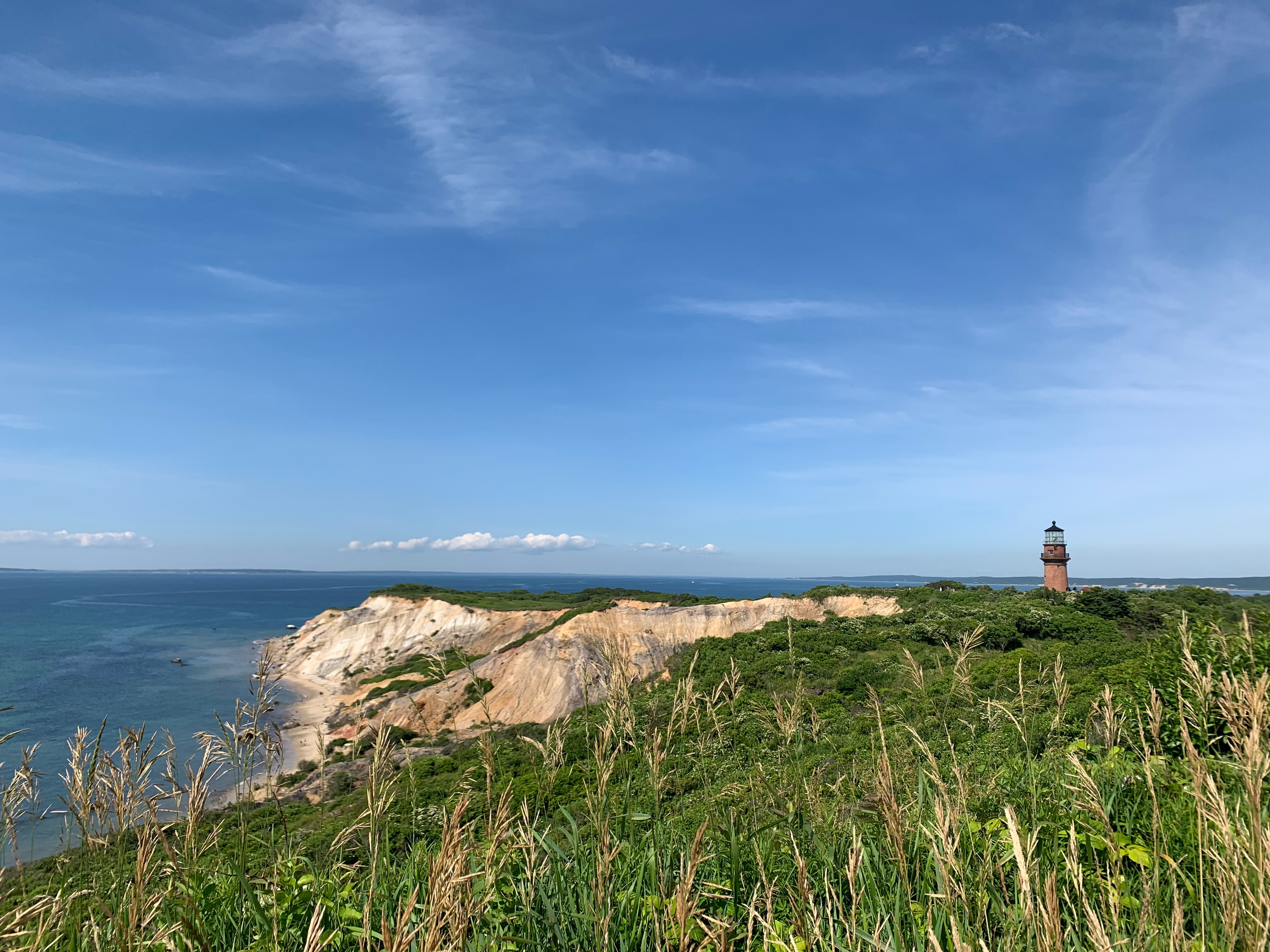
- The Clay Cliffs of Aquinnah and the Gay Head Lighthouse on the western end of Martha's Vineyard.

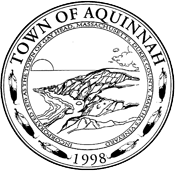
- Flag Seal

- Location in Dukes County in Massachusetts
- Coordinates: 41°20′4″N 70°47′45″W
- Country: United States
- State: Massachusetts
- County: Dukes
- Settled: 1669
- Incorporated: April 13, 1870 (as Gay Head)

Government
  - Type: Open town meeting
  - Town Manager: Jeffrey Madison

Area
  - Total: 40.8 sq mi (105.6 km^{2})
  - Land: 5.4 sq mi (13.9 km^{2})
  - Water: 35.4 sq mi (91.7 km^{2})
- Elevation: 98 ft (30 m)

Population (2020)
  - Total: 439
  - Density: 82/sq mi (31.6/km^{2})
- Time zone: UTC-5 (Eastern)
  - Summer (DST): UTC-4 (Eastern)
- ZIP code: 02535
- Area code: 508 / 774
- FIPS code: 25-01585
- GNIS feature ID: 0618289
- Website: aquinnah-ma.gov

Aquinnah (/əˈkwɪnə/ ə-KWIN-ə; Wampanoag: Âhqunah) is a town on Martha's Vineyard in Massachusetts. From 1870 to 1997, the town was incorporated as Gay Head. At the 2020 U.S. census, the population was 439. Aquinnah is known for its beautiful clay cliffs and natural serenity, as well as its historical importance to the native Wampanoag people. In 1965, Gay Head Cliffs were designated as a National Natural Landmark by the National Park Service.

Aquinnah is celebrated as a center of Wampanoag culture and a center of pride and tradition among members of the federally recognized Wampanoag Tribe of Gay Head. They comprise approximately one-third of the town's voters and are one of two federally recognized tribes of Wampanoag people in Massachusetts. This area is one of the earliest sites of whaling, with the Wampanoag harpooning their catch long before commercial whaling became the major maritime industry of Martha's Vineyard, Nantucket, and New Bedford, Massachusetts, in the 19th century.

== History ==
Before the arrival of English colonists, Martha's Vineyard and Aquinnah were inhabited by the Wampanoag, a Native American people, related to the larger Algonquin Nation of Southern New England. Historically they spoke an Algonquian language, part of a large language family that extended down the Atlantic Coast. Based on archeological testing, scientists estimate the earliest signs of human occupation in what is now Aquinnah date back 10,000 to 7,500 years.

The Wampanoag have a separate history; their creation myth tells that their ancestors reached the island after traveling on an ice floe from the far North. They sided with the English settlers in King Philip's War. They performed whaling from small boats. The character Tashtego in Herman Melville's novel Moby-Dick is a Native American harpooner from Aquinnah.

This area was first conquered by English colonists in 1669. Later colonists officially divided the town of Aquinnah from Chilmark and incorporated it in 1870 as Gay Head, Massachusetts. Gay Head was a descriptive name referring to the brilliant colors of the cliffs and was frequently noted on lists of unusual place names.

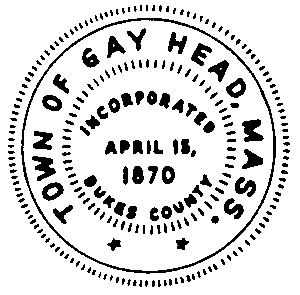
Seal for the town under the name Gay Head, used until 1998.

In 1997, by popular vote of 79 to 76, the town changed its name to Aquinnah, Wampanoag for "land under the hill." Throughout the town's history, a Wampanoag community has been among its residents. The people gained federal recognition as the Wampanoag Tribe of Gay Head in 1987 and controls sovereign tribal lands within the town boundaries.

In 2015, erosion at the town's western end led to a $3.5 million, 129 feet (39 m) move of its prominent, red brick Gay Head Light.

In February 2019, the Wampanoag Tribe of Gay Head announced it will begin construction of the Aquinnah Cliffs Casino in March 2019. The tribe is scheduled to proceed with construction despite opposition from the towns of Aquinnah and Chilmark, and a request from the Martha's Vineyard Commission for the Wampanoag tribe to work with the commission to "preserve the unique values of the Vineyard." The Wampanoag tribe says the commission has no jurisdiction over the project.

During the Island's earliest tourist booms of the late 19th century, ferries brought tourists directly to the Cliff's shores. Today, there is no direct transit between Aquinnah and the mainland. Visitors to the island use commercial planes serving Martha's Vineyard Airport, located in nearby West Tisbury, while others travel by car and ferry.

== Moshup Beach ==
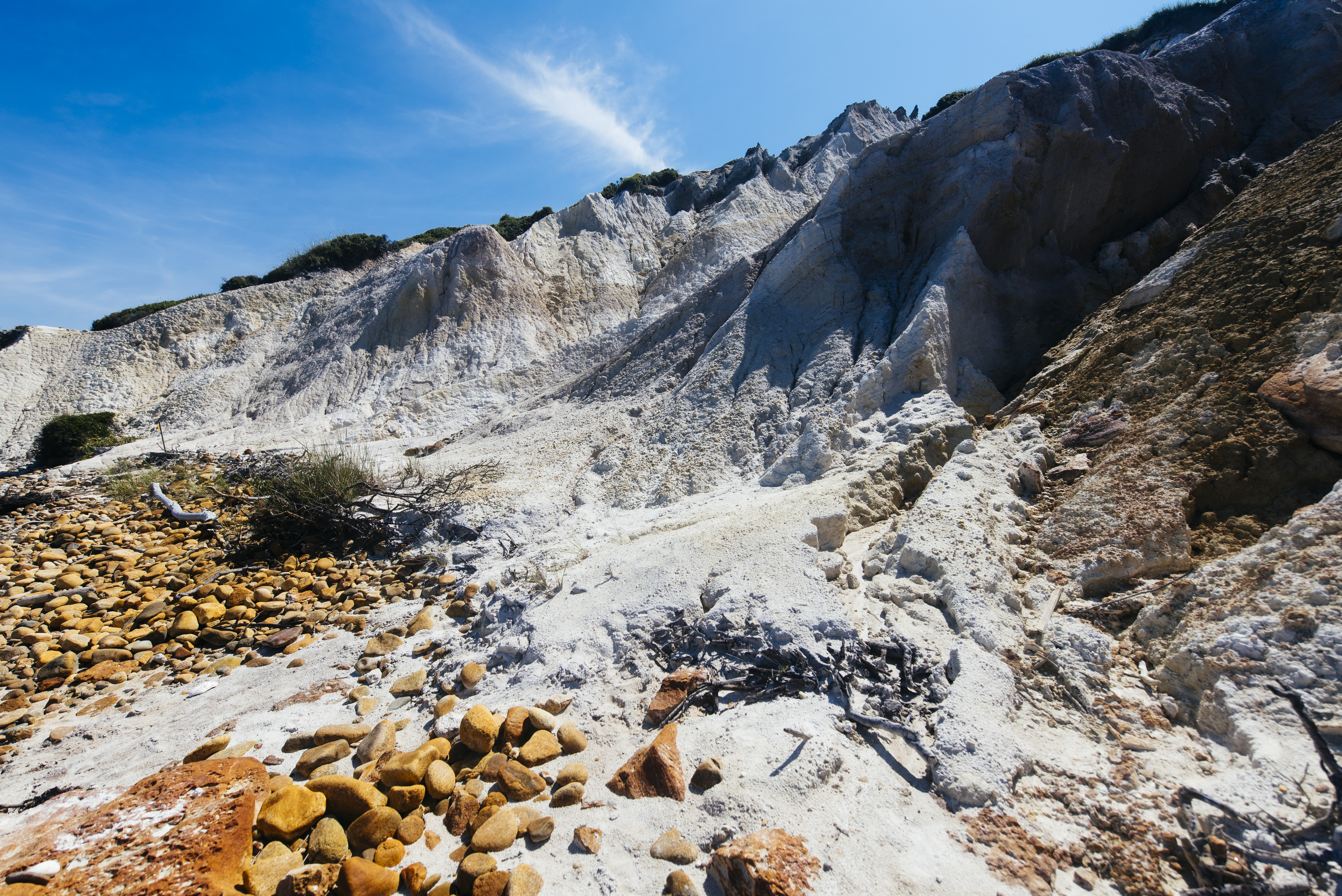
Looking up at the clay cliffs from Moshup Beach

At the foot of the cliffs is Moshup Beach, named after a great Aquinnah Wampanoag sachem who is said to have been at least partially responsible for many of the features of the island's physical landscape. The ocean is a rare aqua color here, with wave heights that are above average for the area. The water sometimes takes on a red, white or grayish tinge resulting from clay eroding from the cliffs above.

The cliffs are owned by the Aquinnah Wampanoag Tribe and jointly protected by the Martha’s Vineyard Land Bank Commission, Sheriff’s Meadow Foundation, and the town of Aquinnah. Protection of the cliffs is enforced by ATV patrols conducted by police and Wampanoag Conservation Rangers, who explain to visitors about the importance of the cliffs to the tribe.

Though not officially designated a "nude beach", nudity is tolerated on Aquinnah Beach several hundred yards northwest of the footpath. The beach has a long history of attracting nude sunbathers who delighted in "clay baths," the baths of which are now strictly prohibited.

== Geography ==
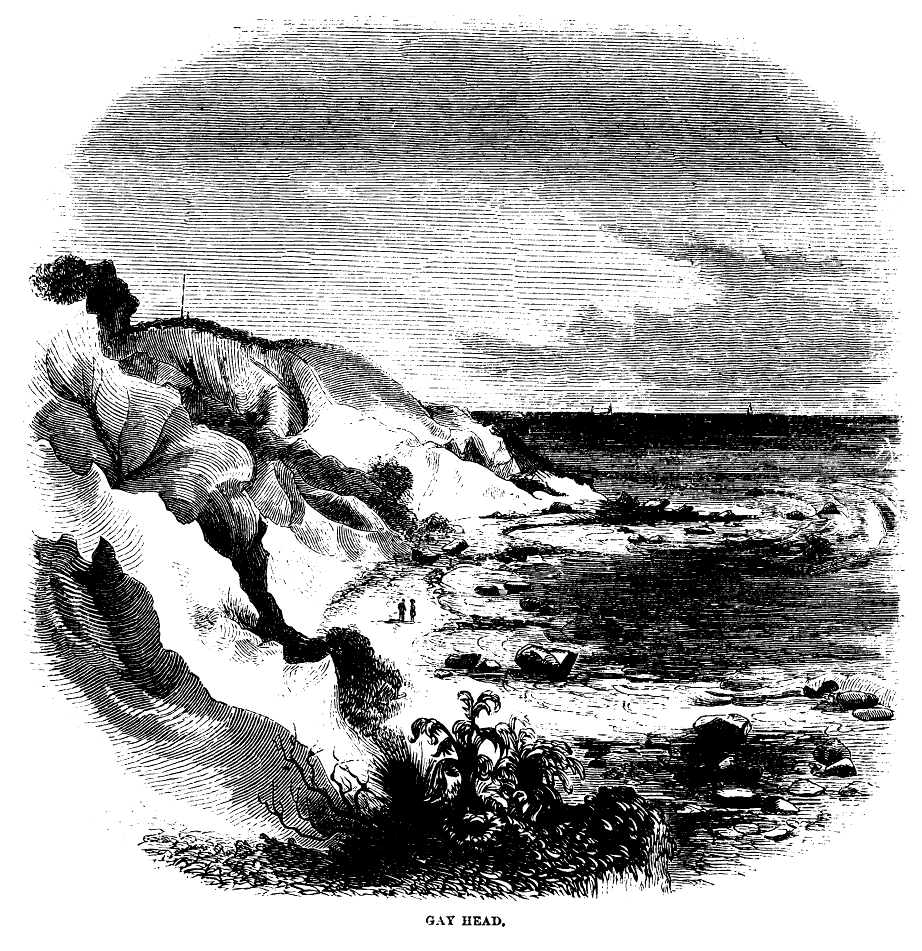
Gay Head (1860); Engraving by David Hunter Strother.

According to the United States Census Bureau, the town has a total area of 40.8 square miles (106 km^{2}), of which 5.4 square miles (14 km^{2}) is land and 35.4 square miles (92 km^{2}) (86.85%) is water. Aquinnah ranks 334th in area out of 351 communities in the Commonwealth, and is the smallest town by land area on the Vineyard. To the north and northwest is the Vineyard Sound and Devil's Bridge. the latter an underwater rock reef most noted for causing the wreck of the City of Columbus in 1884. To the east is the town of Chilmark, its only land border. To the south and west is the Atlantic Ocean. Within viewing distance to the west is the chain of Elizabeth Islands and Nomans Land.

Aquinnah is separated from the town of Chilmark by Menemsha Bight, Menemsha Pond, and Squibnocket Pond. The only road into Aquinnah lies between the ponds. (Squibnocket Beach, which lies between the ocean and Squibnocket Pond, also connects to the town, but is often washed out during storms. No road crosses it.) Squibnocket Point, just east of this beach, is the southernmost point on Martha's Vineyard. Aquinnah has four accessible beaches for residents and the public: Philbin and Moshup (public) Beaches off Moshup Trail; Lobsterville Beach on the northern shore at Dogfish Bar, and Red Beach on Menemsha Pond. Other stretches of beach remain under private ownership.

Aside from Aquinnah's clay cliffs, the landscape is noted for its rolling terrain, heathlands, woods, high sand dunes and beach roses. At the 'head' of the island is the Aquinnah Headlands Preserve which provides sweeping coastal views for walkers.

Aquinnah's geography also lends itself to outdoor activities including surf fishing at Lobsterville Beach and Dog Fish Bar, surfing off the beaches of Moshup Trail, and jogging and cycling the State Road and Moshup Trail loop.

Aquinnah is rare in that it is one of the few western-facing coastlines on the east coast. Even so, it still faces the challenge of coastal erosion like the rest of Martha's Vineyard, Chappaquiddick, and nearby Nantucket. Dunes are fortified with healthy grasses but the southwestern shoreline has faced an annual reduction in its beaches for decades. The cliffs have also faced higher and stronger seas, leading to a 129 foot inland move of the Gay Head Lighthouse in 2015.

== Demographics ==
Historical population
Year	Pop.	±%
1800	200	—
1820	340	+70.0%
1870	160	−52.9%
1880	161	+0.6%
1890	139	−13.7%
1900	173	+24.5%
1910	162	−6.4%
1920	144	−11.1%
1930	161	+11.8%
1940	127	−21.1%
1950	88	−30.7%
1960	103	+17.0%
1970	118	+14.6%
1980	220	+86.4%
1990	201	−8.6%
2000	344	+71.1%
2010	311	−9.6%
2020	439	+41.2%
2024*	451	+2.7%
* = population estimate. Source: United States Census records and Population Estimates Program data.

The Vanderhoop Homestead, looking towards the western-facing coastline.

As of the census of 2000, there were 344 people, 141 households, and 88 families residing in the town. The population density was 64.1 inhabitants per square mile (24.7/km^{2}). There were 463 housing units at an average density of 86.3 per square mile (33.3/km^{2}). The racial makeup of the town was 53.49% White, 0.29% African American, 36.63% Native American, 0.87% from other races, and 8.72% from two or more races. Hispanic or Latino of any race were 1.16% of the population.

There were 141 households, out of which 33.3% had children under the age of 18 living with them, 38.3% were married couples living together, 17.7% had a female householder with no husband present, and 36.9% were non-families. 30.5% of all households were made up of individuals, and 7.8% had someone living alone who was 65 years of age or older. The average household size was 2.44 and the average family size was 3.04.

In the town, the population was spread out, with 25.3% under the age of 18, 8.7% from 18 to 24, 31.7% from 25 to 44, 24.1% from 45 to 64, and 10.2% who were 65 years of age or older. The median age was 37 years. For every 100 females, there were 96.6 males. For every 100 females age 18 and over, there were 84.9 males.

The median income for a household in the town was $45,208, and the median income for a family was $46,458. Males had a median income of $37,917 versus $26,250 for females. The per capita income for the town was $21,420. About 8.6% of families and 7.1% of the population were below the poverty line, including 4.0% of those under age 18 and 14.3% of those age 65 or over.

== Government ==
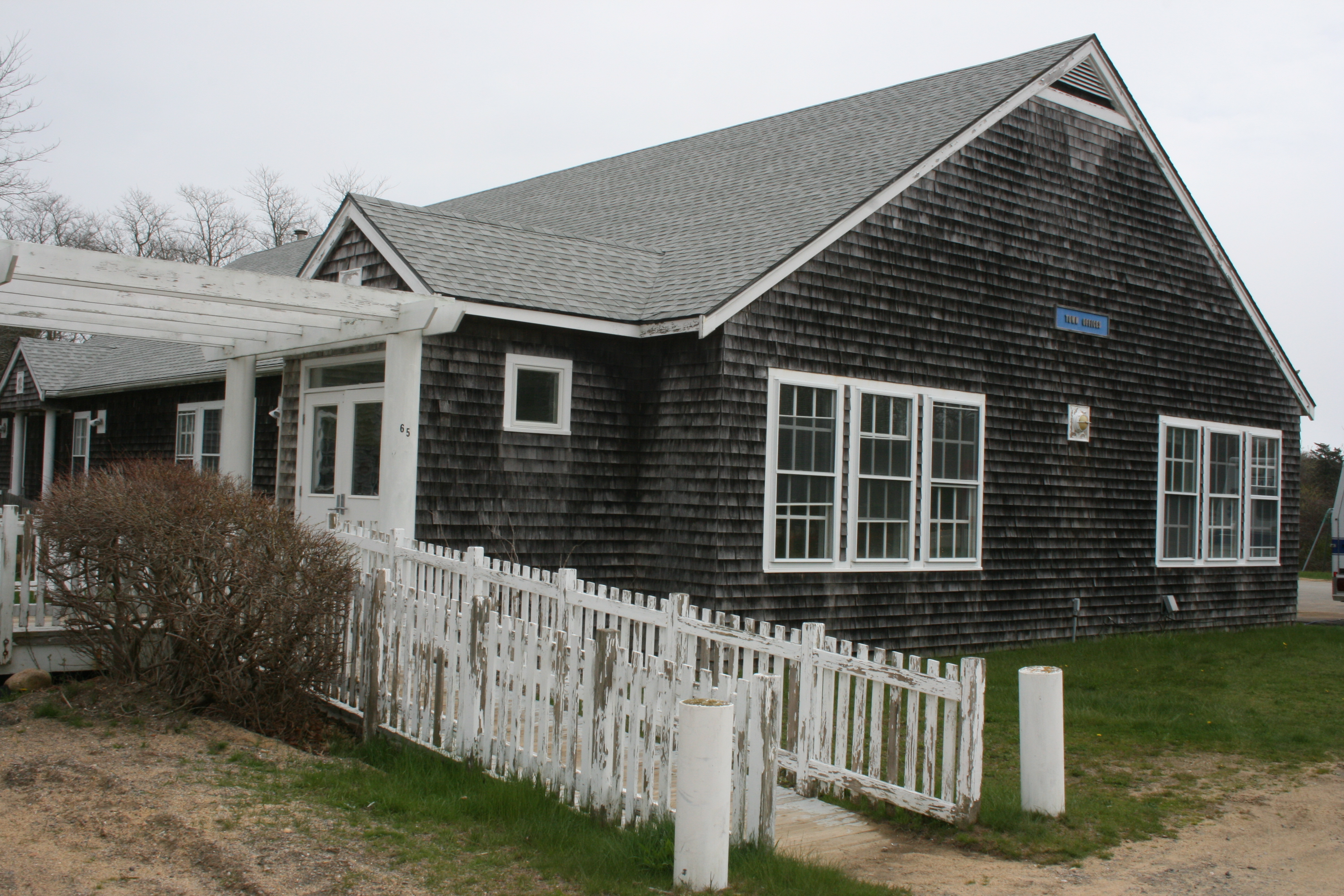
Aquinnah town hall

On the national level, Aquinnah is a part of Massachusetts's 9th congressional district, and is represented by William Keating. The state's senior member of the United States Senate is Elizabeth Warren. The junior Senator is Ed Markey.

On the state level, Aquinnah is represented in the Massachusetts House of Representatives as a part of the Barnstable, Dukes and Nantucket district, which includes all of Martha's Vineyard and Nantucket, as well as a portion of Falmouth. The town is represented in the Massachusetts Senate as a portion of the Cape and Islands district, which includes all of Martha's Vineyard, Nantucket and most of Barnstable County (with the exception of the Towns of Bourne, Sandwich, and Falmouth). All of Dukes County is patrolled by the Fifth (Oak Bluffs) Barracks of Troop D of the Massachusetts State Police.

Aquinnah is governed on the local level by the open town meeting form of government. It is led by an executive secretary and an elected board of selectmen. The town operates its own police and fire departments, near the Town Hall at the town center. The Aquinnah Public Library, a former one-room schoolhouse of less than 1,000 square feet (93 m^{2}), is also nearby. The nearest post office is located 3 miles (4.8 km) away in Chilmark.

In 2001, Aquinnah passed a bylaw requiring archaeological reviews of proposed building sites due to the 10 millennia of Wampanoag history in the town. This bylaw has unearthed scores of significant discoveries.

== Education ==
Aquinnah is served by Martha's Vineyard Regional School District. Chilmark Elementary School and Up-Island School in West Tisbury, serve the town's elementary and middle–school students. Martha's Vineyard Regional High School, located in Oak Bluffs, serves the entire island's high–school population. MVRHS's teams are nicknamed the Vineyarders, and their colors are purple and white. The school has a longstanding rivalry with Nantucket High School, and the annual Island Cup between the football teams attracts a strong following.

== See also ==
- Gay Head-Aquinnah Town Center Historic District
