= Charles Harding Loring =

American engineer (1828–1907)

Charles H. Loring
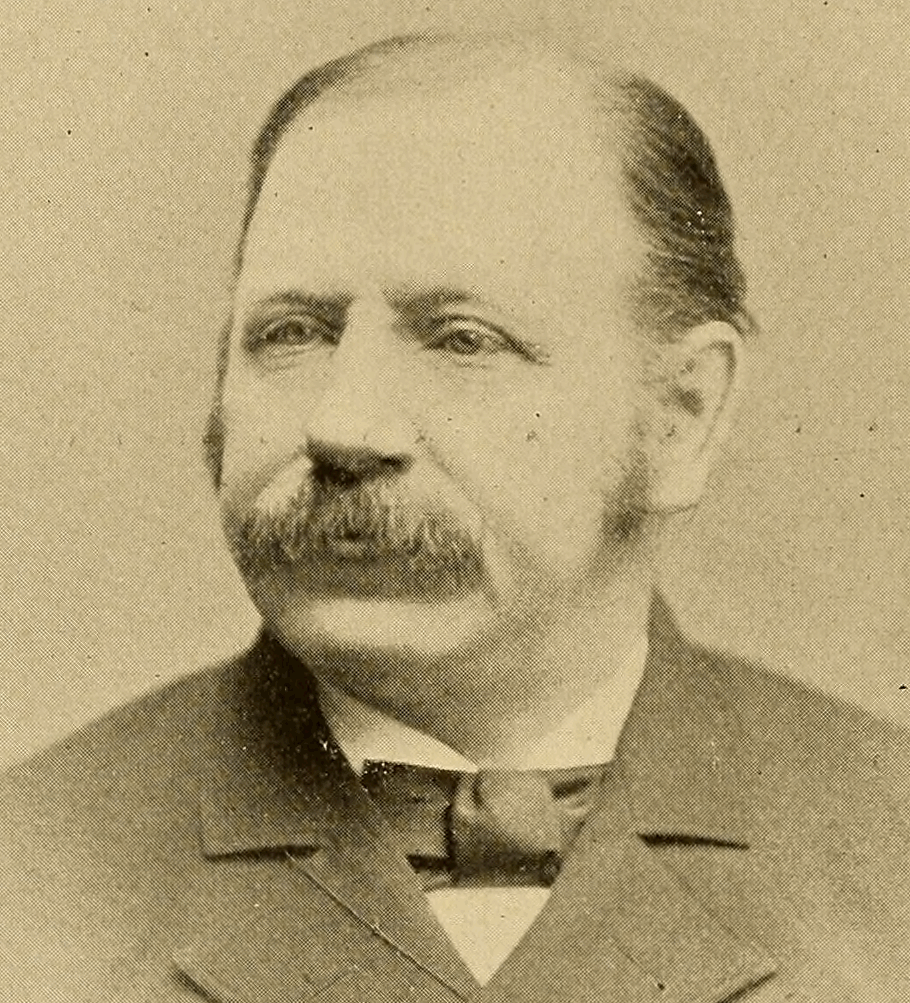
- Loring in 1891

Chief of the Bureau of Steam Engineering
- In office January 18, 1884 – August 8, 1887
- Preceded by: William Henry Shock
- Succeeded by: George Wallace Melville

Personal details
- Born: Charles Harding Loring; December 26, 1828 Boston, Massachusetts, U.S.
- Died: February 5, 1907 (aged 78) Hackettstown, New Jersey, U.S.
- Spouse: Ruth Dingley (m. 1852–1871)
- Children: 1

Military service
- Allegiance: United States
- Branch: United States Navy
- Years of service: 1851–1890
- Rank: Rear admiral
- Conflict: American Civil War

Charles Harding Loring (December 26, 1828 – February 5, 1907) was a U.S. Navy admiral and chief engineer.

== Early life ==
Loring was born on December 26, 1828, and is descended from two Pilgrim forefathers. His father was William Price Loring, who was born in Boston in 1795, and who was in early life a silversmith, and afterwards served as an officer of the customs. He was also an early California pioneer, where he remained until within a few years of his death, which occurred in Boston in 1878. His mother, whose maiden name was Eliza Harding, was born in Haverhill, Massachusetts, in 1800 and bore her husband four daughters and two sons.

== Navy career ==
As his educational period was before the day of technical schools, he followed the usual course of preparation for mechanical engineering and served a regular apprenticeship in the machine shop with Jabez Coney. At its close, in 1851, he entered the United States Navy as a third assistant engineer, attaining, by competitive examination, the highest place in a class of 14.

His entrance was just too late to give him an opportunity for participation in the Mexican–American War, and by the time the American Civil War broke out he had passed through all the junior grades and had become a chief engineer. During his service in junior grades he had been laying the foundation for his more important work when an older man and in higher positions, a portion of his shore duty having been as assistant to the engineer-in-chief of the Navy, in which capacity he had charge of the experimental work and tests of engineering devices coming before that office. While engaged in this duty he made a test of the first injector which came to this country.

=== Civil War ===
During the Civil War he was in active service the whole time, and during the first 18 months was fleet engineer of the North Atlantic Squadron, being attached to the steamer USS Minnesota. He was on board this ship during the attacks of the CSS Virginia on the Northern fleet in the battle of Hampton Roads on March 8–9, 1862, when USS Cumberland was sunk and USS Congress burned, and when the Minnesota also was attacked.

A little later he was detached from sea duty and sent to Cincinnati, Ohio, to supervise the construction of three river and harbor monitors and also of some light-draught sea monitors building there. Subsequently, he was made general inspector of all the iron-clad steamers building west of the Allegheny Mountains, having in charge at one time 11 monitors building at Pittsburgh, Cincinnati, and St. Louis.

During the Civil War a number of excellent engines had been accumulated for hulls which were in process of construction, but with the close of the war all work was stopped, and after a time a board was appointed to recommend the best disposition of these engines which were stored in the various navy yards. It was about this time that the compound engine was coming into general use, and the same board was directed to make a study of the compound engine with a view to its introduction in naval vessels. Of this board, Loring was senior member, and associated with him was Chief Engineer Charles Hinckley Baker.

=== Study of compound engines ===
After a very exhaustive study of the subject, they recommended the introduction of compound engines and the abandonment of the simple form, and the conversion of a number of the engines which were on hand into compound engines. Four sets of these simple engines were so converted and were fitted to the USS Vandalia, USS Marion, USS Quinnebaug, and USS Swatara. The tests of these engines were very satisfactory and showed a coal economy for short runs of not much over two pounds of coal per horsepower hour.

This study of the compound engine made it natural that Loring should be selected as the representative of the Navy Department when, in 1874, he and Charles E. Emery made an elaborate series of trials of the engines of the revenue cutters USRC Richard Rush, USRC Dexter, USRC Dallas, and USRC Gallatin, to determine by actual test the relative economies of compound and simple engines, designed for the same work in similar hulls, and also to secure reliable and authoritative data with respect to the economy of steam jacketing. These tests were the first of the kind conducted under circumstances of entire reliability, with the result that the report of the trials was republished all over the world and is still quoted in all the text books on steam engineering.

=== Fleet engineering ===
Loring's next tour of sea duty was as a fleet engineer of the Asiatic Squadron on the USS Tennessee, where he had as his chief assistant, George W. Melville, who later became his successor as Chief of the Bureau of Steam Engineering. There was nothing especially eventful in this cruise, and at its end, in 1880, he was assigned as the head of the steam engineering department of the New York Navy Yard.

This was the period of greatest inactivity in the history of the Navy, and there was little to do, even for a very active man, except routine work. During this tour, however. Loring was senior member of a board that made a test of the machinery of the Anthracite, a little yacht with a triple-expansion engine working with 600 pounds pressure. The experiments were valuable as showing that, with the form of apparatus on board the Anthracite, there was no such gain in economy as to warrant the tremendous pressure carried, while it involved numerous practical difficulties.

In 1881, he was a member of what is known as the First Naval Advisory Board, appointed by Secretary William H. Hunt to formulate a shipbuilding program for the Navy which he might submit to Congress. The personnel of this advisory board was distinguished in all its branches, and the work they did made possible our fleet of today, as they decided to abandon wooden hulls for those of iron and steel. In 1882, he was a member of the Navy Yard Board, of which Admiral Stephen Luce was senior member. The duty of this board was to visit all the navy yards of the country for the purpose of determining which be closed. It was a delicate task, but the report, when finally approved, gave general satisfaction, and its recommendations were carried out.

=== Bureau of Steam Engineering ===
On the retirement of the engineer-in-chief, William H. Shock, only two successors were thought of, one of whom was Loring, and his merit and thorough qualification for the position were so well recognized that the appointment came to him entirely unsought. This was in 1884, during the administration of President Chester A. Arthur. Secretary William E. Chandler was presiding over the Navy Department at this time, and it was under his supervision that the four vessels commonly known as the Roach cruisers, the USS Atlanta, USS Boston, USS Chicago, and USS Dolphin, were built.

Part of the scheme of building the new navy was the organization of what was known as an advisory board, composed of two civilians and a number of naval officers. Owing to this regime the bureaus were not given the same free hand that has obtained since the advisory board was discontinued, although they did valuable work in the details of designs. Forced draft was used on these new vessels, after having been tried on two others—the Alliance and Swatara—under Loring's direction.

In 1885, with the advent of a new administration, there was a general spirit of unrest about the Navy Department from what seemed to be a prevailing belief that whatever was, was wrong. The air was filled with rumors of intended changes, among them one which promised to cause a violation of the contract labor law, as it was actually seriously under consideration to import a British engineer and put him in charge of the design of machinery. From this intent and other indications it became evident to Loring that he did not enjoy the Secretary's confidence, and he tendered his resignation.

After leaving the Bureau of Steam Engineering he was appointed as a senior member of the Experimental Board of Naval Officers at the New York Navy Yard. Under his direction, the board conducted competitive tests of water-tube boilers to determine the type that should be used on the coast-defence vessel USS Monterey.

Another series of experiments conducted by Loring were those on the boilers of the torpedo boat USS Cushing, to determine the economy of evaporation with different air pressures and rates of combustion. These experiments have proven of the to be a form of valuable collection of engineering data. A number of clever devices had to be schemed out to carry on these tests, and the whole success was credited to Loring and the board.

== Retirement ==
Having reached the age limit in December 1890, he was placed on the retired list; but having always been a man of very vigorous physique, he did not give up active employment and was for a time consulting engineer to the United States and Brazil Mail Steamship Company. During the Spanish–American War he was recalled to active duty and assigned as inspector of engineering work in New York City.

Loring's naval record reflects his active service, though contemporary accounts also emphasize his social activities. He was noted for his public speaking and writing, as well as his participation in social gatherings.

He was for two years president of the Engineers' Club of New York, which is a sure test of popularity and wide acquaintance in the engineering world. He was also president of the American Society of Mechanical Engineers, the highest honor which his branch of the profession could confer. He was a vice-president of the Society of Naval Architects and Marine Engineers from its formation until his death, and, as long as his health permitted, was very active in its council and general meetings. He was a member of our own Society from the beginning. He had also been very active in the Army and Navy Club of New York, filling various offices and acting as its secretary for several years. Lording succumbed to an attack of paralysis.

Loring's career covered almost the whole period of progress in marine engineering from the side-wheel engine and box boilers down to the triple-expansion engine and steam turbine, forced draft and the water-tube boiler. In nearly all of this progress he played an important part, and he had done both his duty and he had been a factor in the continued advancement of the profession and the service he loved.

== Bibliography ==
- Brayley, A. W. (1894). Schools and Schoolboys of Old Boston. Boston: L. G. Hager. pp. 426–427. OCLC 680441827.
- Henry, C. H., ed. (1917). Loring Genealogy. Cambridge: Murray and Emery Co. p. 271. OCLC 277225235.
- McFarland, W. M. (1907). "Charles Harding Loring". Journal of the American Society of Mechanical Engineers. 19 (1): 270–275.
