= List of shipwrecks in January 1884 =

The list of shipwrecks in January 1884 includes ships sunk, foundered, grounded, or otherwise lost during January 1884.

== 1 January ==
List of shipwrecks: 1 January 1884
Ship	State	Description
Halo	United Kingdom	The steamship was wrecked near Cabo Corrobedo, Spain. Her crew were rescued. She was on a voyage from Brăila, Romania to Rotterdam, South Holland, Netherlands.

== 2 January ==
List of shipwrecks: 2 January 1884
Ship	State	Description
Bentuther	United Kingdom	The barque was wrecked on Grassholm, Pembrokeshire. Her eleven crew were rescued by the ketch Tilly (United Kingdom). Bentuther was on a voyage from Havre de Grâce, Seine-Inférieure, France to the River Mersey.
I. N. Bunton	United States	The tow steamship was wrecked in the Ohio River when she struck the pier of the Davis Island Dam with the loss of four lives.

== 3 January ==
List of shipwrecks: 3 January 1884
Ship	State	Description
Duke of Westminster	United Kingdom	The steamship was driven ashore at Atherfield, Isle of Wight. Her twenty passengers were landed by a lifeboat. She was on a voyage from London to Brisbane, Queensland.
Jessamine	United Kingdom	The brig was driven ashore and wrecked on the south coast of Guernsey, Channel Islands. Her crew were rescued.
Veritas	United Kingdom	The ship was driven ashore at the South Foreland Lighthouse, Kent. She was on a voyage from Cowes, Isle of Wight to Hartlepool, County Durham. She was refloated the next day.

== 4 January ==
List of shipwrecks: 4 January 1884
Ship	State	Description
Annie Eline	Denmark	The schooner was driven ashore and wrecked at Ardglass, County Down, United Kingdom. She was on a voyage from Denmark to Belfast, County Antrim, United Kingdom.
Rowan	United Kingdom	The ssteamship was driven ashore near Pauillac, Gironde, France. She was on a voyage from Brindisi, Italy to Bordeaux, Gironde. She was refloated on 6 January and completed her voyage.
Unnamed	Flag unknown	The steamship was driven ashore on Chesil Beach, Dorset, United Kingdom. She was refloated and resumed her voyage.

== 7 January ==
List of shipwrecks: 7 January 1884
Ship	State	Description
Emma	Germany	The steamship was driven ashore at Pillau. She was on a voyage from Rotterdam, South Holland, Netherland to Liepāja, Russia.
Inverarnan	United Kingdom	The ship was sighted in the South Atlantic whilst on a voyage from Batavia, Netherlands East Indies to Queenstown, County Cork. No further trace, reported overdue.
Leap	United Kingdom	The smack struck a rock and sank at Glandore, County Cork.
Lockett	Cape Colony	The dredger was driven ashore and wrecked at East London. Her crew were rescued.
Samuele	Italy	The ship sprang a leak and was beached on Madeira, where she became a wreck. Her crew survived. She was on a voyage from Agrigento, Sicily to Charleston, South Carolina, United States.

== 8 January ==
List of shipwrecks: 8 January 1884
Ship	State	Description
Elmina	United Kingdom	The Barquentine ran aground on a sandbar and broke up near Long Beach Island, New Jersey.

== 10 January ==
List of shipwrecks: 10 January 1884
Ship	State	Description
Annan	United Kingdom	The steamship was driven ashore at Nidingen, Sweden. She was on a voyage from Danzig, Germany to West Hartlepool, County Durham.
Benisaf	United Kingdom	The steamship was driven on to the Devil's Bank, in Liverpool Bay. She was refloated with the assistance of two tugs.
Bessie Morris	United Kingdom	The ship ran aground on an uncharted rock in the Red Sea. She was on a voyage from Cardiff, Glamorgan to Saigon, French Indo-China. She was refloated and resumed her voyage.
Constance	United Kingdom	The ship departed from Porto, Portugal for Saint John's, Newfoundland Colony. No further trace,. reported missing.
Windsor	United Kingdom	The paddle steamer ran aground in the Belfast Lough.

== 11 January ==
List of shipwrecks: 11 January 1884
Ship	State	Description
Louisa	United Kingdom	The Mersey Flag sank off Egremont, Lancashire. Her crew were rescued. She was on a voyage from Liverpool, Lancashire to the River Dee.
Triumph	United Kingdom	The steamship struck a rock at Dartmouth, Devon and was beached. She was on a voyage from Odesa, Russia to London.

== 14 January ==
List of shipwrecks: 14 January 1884
Ship	State	Description
Henrietta	United Kingdom	The barge collided with the steamship Saxon Prince (United Kingdom) and sank in the Sloyne. Her crew were rescued.

== 15 January ==
List of shipwrecks: 15 January 1884
Ship	State	Description
Loire Inférieure	France	The steamship ran aground on the Goodwin Sands, Kent, United Kingdom. She was on a voyage from Hamburg, Germany to Havre de Grâce, Seine-Inférieure. She was refloated with the assistance of a tug and resumed her voyage.
Volmer	Denmark	The steamship was driven ashore at "Refsnas". She was on a voyage from Sunderland, County Durham, United Kingdom ot Kiel, Germany.

== 16 January ==
List of shipwrecks: 16 January 1884
Ship	State	Description
Fusilier	United Kingdom	The barque was driven ashore and wrecked about 4.3 nautical miles (8 km) south of Koitiata, New Zealand.

== 17 January ==
List of shipwrecks: 17 January 1884
Ship	State	Description
Bessie Wilkinson	United Kingdom	The ship departed from Newport, Monmouthshire for Skibbereen, County Cork. No further trace, reported overdue.
HMS Clarence	Royal Navy	The reformatory ship caught fire in the River Mersey at Liverpool, Lancashire. She sank the next day.
Freia	Germany	The ship departed from Hartlepool, County Durham, United Kingdom for Marsala, Italy. No further trace, reported missing.
Medusa	United Kingdom	The ship departed from Leith, Lothian for Montevideo, Uruguay. No further trace, reported missing.

== 18 January ==
List of shipwrecks: 18 January 1884
Ship	State	Description
Anna	United Kingdom	The ship departed from Swansea, Glamorgan for Lisbon, Portugal. No further trace, reported overdue.
City of Columbus	United States	USRC Dexter (left) aiding the wrecked City of Columbus (right) The passenger ship was wrecked on Devil's Bridge Rocks, off the Gay Head Cliffs, Massachusetts with the loss of 114 of the 143 people on board. Survivors were rescued by two boats launched from shore by Wampanoags and by the revenue cutter USRC Dexter ( United States Revenue-Marine).
Miningu	United Kingdom	The ship departed from Penarth, Glamorgan for Rio de Janeiro, Brazil. No further trace,. reported missing.
L'Indépance	France	L'Indépance The barque was wrecked at Zandvoort, North Holland, Netherlands.

== 19 January ==
List of shipwrecks: 19 January 1884
Ship	State	Description
Stephenson	United Kingdom	The steamship was wrecked off Skagen, Denmark. She was on a voyage from Hull, Yorkshire to Malmö, Sweden.

== 20 January ==
List of shipwrecks: 20 January 1884
Ship	State	Description
Benavon	United Kingdom	The steamship was abandoned off South Ronaldshay, Orkney Islands. She was subsequently reboarded and towed in to Longhope, Orkney Islands by two tugs.
Corsair	United Kingdom	The ship departed from the River Tyne for Totnes, Devon. No further trace, reported overdue.
Laura	United Kingdom	The brigantine was driven ashore on Stronsay, Orkney Islands. She was on a voyage from Runcorn, Cheshire to Newcastle upon Tyne, Northumberland.

== 21 January ==
List of shipwrecks: 21 January 1884
Ship	State	Description
Fanny	United Kingdom	The ship departed from Sunderland, County Durham for London. No further trace, reported missing.
Patie	United Kingdom	The schooner was driven ashore on Goat Island, off Stornoway, Isle of Lewis, Outer Hebrides. Her crew were rescued. She was on a voyage from Runcorn, Cheshire to Newcastle upon Tyne, Northumberland.
St. Gothard	United Kingdom	The steamship ran aground in the Gironde. She was on a voyage from Sulina, Romania to Bordeaux, Gironde. She was refloated.

== 22 January ==
List of shipwrecks: 22 January 1884
Ship	State	Description
Cicerone	United Kingdom	The schooner ran aground on the Stony Binks, at the mouth of the Humber. Her crew were rescued by the Spurn Lifeboat. Cicerone was on a voyage from South Shields, County Durham to Falmouth, Cornwall. She was refloated and found to be severely leaky. She was subsequently taken in to Grimsby, Lincolnshire.
Jane Grey	United Kingdom	The schooner was destroyed by fire in the North Sea 20 nautical miles (37 km) off St. Abb's Head, Berwickshire. Her four crew were rescued by the steam trawler Chevy Chase (United Kingdom). Jane Grey was on a voyage from Hull, Yorkshire to Dunbar, Lothian.
Queen of the Isles	United Kingdom	The schooner was driven ashore in Stokes Bay. She was refloated with the assistance of a tug and towed in to Portsmouth, Hampshire.

== 23 January ==
List of shipwrecks: 23 January 1884
Ship	State	Description
Alma	Norway	The barque was abandoned off Maryport, Cumberland, United Kingdom. Her crew were rescued by the Maryport Lifeboat. She was reboarded the next day and found to be severely damaged.
Caerleon	United Kingdom	The steamship was driven at Towyn, Caernarfonshire. Her crew survived. She was on a voyage from Whitehaven, Cumberland to Cardiff, Glamorgan.
Eliza	United Kingdom	The lighter was driven ashore at Burnham-on-Sea, Somerset.
Ellen	United Kingdom	The ship was abandoned off Tenby, Pembrokeshire. Her two crew were rescued by the Tenby Lifeboat.
Excel	United Kingdom	The schooner was driven ashore at Swansea, Glamorgan.
Guide	United Kingdom	The ship was driven ashore at Burnham-on-Sea.
Heather Bell	United Kingdom	The steamship was driven into HMS Warrior (Royal Navy) then drove ashore at Ryde, Isle of Wight. She was refloated.
Ida	United Kingdom	The schooner was driven into the pier at Garston, Lancashire and damaged. She was on a voyage from Wexford to Liverpool, Lancashire.
Irene	United Kingdom	The yacht sank at Greenock, Renfrewshire.
Jane Sarah	United Kingdom	The ketch was abandoned off Tenby. Her three crew were rescued by the Tenby Lifeboat.
Moy	United Kingdom	The ship departed from Troon, Ayrshire for Campbeltown, Argyllshire. No further trace, reported missing.
Silksworth	United Kingdom	The ship sank in the English Channel 3 nautical miles (5.6 km) off Rye Harbour, Sussex with the loss of her captain from her eight crew. She was on a voyage from Fécamp, Seine-Inférieure, France to Rye, Sussex.
Waterwitch	United Kingdom	The yacht sank at Greenock.
Weasel	United Kingdom	The yacht was driven ashore and wrecked at Greenock.

== 24 January ==
List of shipwrecks: 24 January 1884
Ship	State	Description
Caroline	United Kingdom	The ship was driven ashore and severely damaged at Silloth, Cumberland. Her crew survived. She was on a voyage from Belfast, County Antrim to Maryport, Cumberland. She was refloated in late April.
Caspian	Flag unknown	The ship ran aground on the Sinkerplaat, in the Scheldt. She subsequently broke in two.
Concepcion	Spain	The ship ran aground in the Scheldt. She was on a voyage from Antwerp, Belgium to Havana, Cuba.
Eleanor	United Kingdom	The schooner was driven ashore at Westport, County Mayo. She was on a voyage from Westport to the Bristol Channel.
Emma	Germany	The schooner was driven ashore in the Scheldt at the Marguerite Polde.
Olinde Rodriguez	France	The steamship struck sunken rocks off Belle Île, Morbihan. She was on a voyage from Havre de Grâce, Seine-Inférieure to Bordeaux, Gironde and Colón, United States of Colombia. She put in to Saint-Nazaire, Loire-Inférieure in a leaky condition.
Olympus	United Kingdom	The steamship ran aground in the Scheldt at "Oosterputten". She was on a voyage from Antwerp to Cardiff, Glamorgan. She was refloated on 28 January and put back to Antwerp.
Si	Flag unknown	The ship ran aground in the Scheldt. She subsequently broke in two.
Vijf Gebroeders	Flag unknown	The lighter sank in the Schledt at "Saaflings".
Three unnamed vessels	Flags unknown	The ships ran aground in the Scheldt.

== 25 January ==
List of shipwrecks: 25 January 1884
Ship	State	Description
City of Lucknow, and Simla	South Australia; United Kingdom	The clipper City of Lucknow collided with the full-rigged ship Simla in the English Channel 25 nautical miles (46 km) south west of The Needles, Isle of Wight. The steamship Guernsey (United Kingdom) rescued six of the 28 crew of City of Lucknow and eleven of the 50 people from Simla.City of Lucknow was on a voyage from Port Adelaide to London. She was subsequently taken in tow by two tugs. Simla was on a voyage from London to Sydney, New South Wales. Nicholas Vagliano (Flag unknown) rescued all 24 people remaining aboard Simla on 28 January.
Cyrus	United Kingdom	The steamship struck a sunken rock at Porto, Portugal and was holed. She was on a voyage from South Shields, County Durham to Porto.
Louis	United Kingdom	The schooner was driven ashore at IJmuiden, North Holland, Netherlands. Her crew were rescued. She was on a voyage from Plymouth, Devon, United Kingdom to Hamburg.

== 26 January ==
List of shipwrecks: 26 January 1884
Ship	State	Description
Adelaide	United Kingdom	The ship was driven ashore in the Belfast Lough.
Alliance	United Kingdom	The schooner was driven into Deal Pier, Kent, which was severely damaged.
Agnes	United Kingdom	The ship was driven ashore in the Belfast Lough.
Albert	United Kingdom	The schooner was severely damaged at Maryport, Cumberland.
Alura	Norway	The barque was driven ashore at Maryport. Her crew were rescued.
Amelia	United Kingdom	The schooner was driven ashore and wrecked in the Holy Loch.
Arran	United Kingdom	The barque was driven ashore in the Gare Loch.
Aurora	United Kingdom	The ship was driven ashore in the Belfast Lough. She was later refloated and towed in to Belfast, County Antrim.
Bon Pasteur	France	The ketch was driven across the breakwater at Plymouth, Devon, United Kingdom and broke her back. Her crew survived. The wreck was then washed off the breakwater. She was on a voyage from Havre de Grâce, Seine-Inférieure to Bristol, Gloucestershire, United Kingdom.
Charles Walker	United Kingdom	The schooner was driven ashore at Wexford.
Cviet	Austria-Hungary	The barque was deliberately run aground, 330 yards (300 m) east of Porthleven harbour, Cornwall, England, during a severe gale with the loss of three of her eleven crew. Cviet was on a voyage from Saint Domingo to Falmouth, Cornwall. She broke up on 1 February.
E. A. Bird	United Kingdom	The ship was driven ashore in the Belfast Lough.
Edith	United Kingdom	The schooner was wrecked at Happisburgh, Norfolk with the loss of all hands.
Elizabeth Mary	United Kingdom	The ship was driven ashore in the Belfast Lough.
Emily	United Kingdom	The brigantine was driven ashore on the Holy Island, in the Firth of Clyde. She was on a voyage from Ardrossan, Ayrshire to Belfast.
Eugenie	United Kingdom	The ship was driven ashore and wrecked in the River Usk. She was on a voyage from Newport, Monmouthshire to Bristol, Gloucestershire.
Evans	United Kingdom	The full-rigged ship was driven ashore at Larne, County Antrim. She was on a voyage from Bangor to Aberdeen.
G. D. T.	United Kingdom	The brigantine was driven ashore in St Aubin's Bay, Jersey, Channel Islands. Her crew were rescued.
Gleaner	United Kingdom	The schooner was driven ashore and sank at Greenock. Her crew were rescued by a lifeboat from HMS Shannon (Royal Navy). Gleaner was on a voyage from Paisley, Renfrewshire to Dublin.
Harmonie	Netherlands	The schooner was driven ashore in Batten Bay. She was on a voyage from Copenhagen, Denmark to Marseille, Bouches-du-Rhône, France.
H. Porter	United Kingdom	The brigantine was driven ashore on the Holy Isle, in the Firth of Clyde. She was on a voyage from Belfast to Irvine, Ayrshire. She was refloated on 25 April.
John Clifton	United Kingdom	The ship sank at Greenock with the loss of two of her four crew. Survivors were rescued by a lifeboat from HMS Shannon (Royal Navy). John Clifton was on a voyage from Glasgow, Renfrewshire to Dundalk, County Louth.
Katherine	United Kingdom	The smack sank in the Holy Loch.
Lauderdale	United Kingdom	The ship was abandoned in the Atlantic Ocean 400 nautical miles (740 km) west of Cape Clear Island, County Cork. Her crew were rescued by Medea (United Kingdom), which lost five of her crew effecting the rescue. Lauderdale was on a voyage from Junín to Hamburg, Germany.
Liffey Maid	United Kingdom	The schooner was driven ashore in Sutton Harbour, Devon. She was on a voyage from London to Stranraer, Wigtownshire. She was later refloated with the assistance of a tug and towed in to Sutton Harbour.
Lyon	United Kingdom	The schooner was driven ashore in the Holy Loch. She was on a voyage from Glasgow to Dundalk.
Margaret	United Kingdom	The schooner was driven ashore at Castlemaine, County Kerry. She was on a voyage from Swansea, Glamorgan to Killorglin, County Kerry.
Mary Campbell	United Kingdom	The ship sank at Maryport.
Mary Ellen	United Kingdom	The schooner was driven ashore at Campbeltown, Argyllshire. Her crew were rescued.
Mary Jane	United Kingdom	The ship was driven ashore in the Belfast Lough. She was later refloated and towed in to Belfast.
Mary Louisa	United Kingdom	The ship was driven ashore in the Belfast Lough. She was later refloated and towed in to Belfast.
Nokomis	United Kingdom	The ship was driven ashore at Port Stewart, County Londonderry with the loss of all sixgeen people on board. She was on a voyage from Londonderry to Baltimore, Maryland, United States.
Olive Branch	United Kingdom	The fishing trawler was driven ashore and severely damaged at Plymouth. She was refloated and towed in to Sutton Harbour, where she was beached.
Phillis	United Kingdom	The schooner was driven ashore at Campbeltown.
Pursuit	United Kingdom	The ship was driven ashore at Campbeltown. Her crew were rescued.
Royal Victoria	United Kingdom	The schooner was driven ashore at Campbeltown.
Royal William	United Kingdom	The schooner was driven ashore at Campbeltown. Her crew were rescued.
Sea Belle	United Kingdom	The ship was driven ashore and sank at Plymouth.
Snowdrop	United Kingdom	The smack was driven ashore on the Holy Island. She was on a voyage from Paisley to Belfast.
St. George	United Kingdom	The ship was wrecked at Maryport.
Thomas	United Kingdom	The schooner was driven ashore at Carrickfergus, County Antrim. Her crew were rescued.
Thomas	United Kingdom	The ship was driven ashore in the Belfast Lough.
Turkistan	United Kingdom	The ship broke from her moorings at Glasgow and was driven broadside on down the Clyde. She collided with the steamship Toward and Solway then with Maglona (all United Kingdom) before running into and sinking a ferryboat.
Venture	United Kingdom	The ship was driven ashore in the Belfast Lough.
Virginia	United Kingdom	The brigantine was driven ashore on the Holy Island. She was on a voyage from Belfast to Troon.
William	United Kingdom	The ship sank at Maryport.
William Meyer	Germany	The barquentine was driven ashore on the Holy Island. She was on a voyage from Liverpool, Lancashire to Troon, Ayrshire.
Zoe	United Kingdom	The schooner was driven into a bridge at Laira, Devon and severely damaged.
Unnamed	Flag unknown	The barque was wrecked in the Solway Firth. She was then driven through the pier at Maryport.
Two unnamed vessels	United Kingdom	The fishing vessels were driven ashore at Plymouth.
Unnamed	Flag unknown	The schooner sank in the Holy Loch.

== 27 January ==
List of shipwrecks: 27 January 1884
Ship	State	Description
Alice	Germany	The steamship was driven ashore at Lilly Head, Pembrokeshire, United Kingdom. She was on a voyage from Cartagena, Spain to Newport, Monmouthshire. She was refloated and completed her voyage.
Augusta	Sweden	The schooner foundered with the loss of the master and one crew.
Bannisan	United Kingdom	The schooner was driven ashore and wrecked at Lytham St. Annes, Lancashire with the loss of a crew member. Survivors were rescued by the Southport Lifeboat. She was on a voyage from Charleston, South Carolina to Liverpool, Lancashire.
Clarence	United Kingdom	The steamship ran aground on Walney Islanda, Lancashire and sank with the loss of three of her crew. She was on a voyage from Rock Ferry, Cheshire to Workington, Cumberland.
G. D. T.	Canada	The brigantine was driven ashore in St Aubin's Bay, Jersey, Channel Islands, and was wrecked.
Goefredo	Portugal	The steamship ran aground off Santiago de Cuba, Cuba. She was refloated and sent to Liverpool, Lancashire for repairs.
Clarence	Flag unknown	The steamship foundered off "Hilpaford" with the loss of three lives.
Helen Finlayson	United Kingdom	The ship broke from her moorings and was driven into the steamship Iberia (United Kingdom) at Ardrossan, Ayrshire.
Juno	United Kingdom	The full-rigged ship ran aground on Taylor's Bank, in Liverpool Bay with the loss of 25 or 31 lives. She was on a voyage from the River Mersey to Calcutta, India.
Nokomis	Flag unknown	The barque was driven ashore at the mouth of the River Foyle with the loss of sixteen lives.
Unnamed	Flag unknown	The barque capsized off Ilfracombe, Devon, United Kingdom.
Unnamed	Flag unknown	The ship was wrecked near Liverpool with the loss of all hands.
Several unnamed vessels	Flags unknown	The ships were lost at Folkestone, Kent, United Kingdom; dead bodies were washed ashore at Hythe and Dungeness.

== 28 January ==
List of shipwrecks: 28 January 1884
Ship	State	Description
Champion	Canada	The barque capsized in the Atlantic Ocean with the loss of eight of her thirteen crew. Survivors were rescued by the steamship Sirocco (United Kingdom). Champion was on a voyage from Baltimore, Maryland, United States to Hamburg, Germany.
David Anterson	United States	The ship was driven ashore at Penedo, Brazil. She was on a voyage from San Salvador, El Salvador to an American port.
Frances Ann	United Kingdom	The Mersey Flat sank at Garston, Lancashire.
Lizzie Porter	United Kingdom	The ship was wrecked near Bannec, Finistère, France.
Louise	United Kingdom	The Mersey Flag was wrecked at Garston.
Simeon	United Kingdom	The Mersey Flat sank in the River Mersey downstream of Garston.
Speel	United Kingdom	The schooner was abandoned in the North Sea. Her crew were rescued by F. De Maeschalk (Flag unknown). Speed was on a voyage from Hartlepool, County Durham to Dover, Kent.
Sybil Wynn	United Kingdom	The brig was driven ashore in Ballyholme Bay, County Down. She was on a voyage from Troon, Ayrshire to Limerick.
Willie	United Kingdom	The Mersey Flat was driven ashore at Garston.

== 29 January ==
List of shipwrecks: 29 January 1884
Ship	State	Description
Caledonia	United Kingdom	The ship sank in the North Sea with the loss of two of her crew.
Chin Kiang	United Kingdom	The steamship was wrecked at Huitan Point, China with the loss of 56 of the 74 people on board. She was on a voyage from Hong Kong to Shanghai, Chian.
Engelbrecht	Sweden	The barque was driven ashore at Luccombe, Isle of Wight, United Kingdom. She was on a voyage from Havre de Grâce, Seine-Inférieure, France to Savannah, Georgia, United States. She was refloated with assistance and taken in to Cowes, Isle of Wight in a leaky condition.

== 30 January ==
List of shipwrecks: 30 January 1884
Ship	State	Description
Bezaleel	United Kingdom	The schooner struck the Goodwin Sands, Kent, capsized and sank. Her crew were rescued by the steamship Norwegian (United Kingdom). Bezaleel was on a voyage from the Benin River to Schiedam, South Holland, Netherlands.
Elise Pettersen	Flag unknown	The steamship was driven ashore at Mandal, Norway. She was on a voyage from Riga, Russia to Leith, Lothian, United Kingdom.
Eulomene	United Kingdom	The ship ran aground in the River Conway. Her 29 crew were rescued. She was on a voyage from Liverpool, Lancashire to Calcutta, India.
Gioja	Norway	The brig was driven ashore at "Sonatlie", Sicily, Italy. Her crew were rescued. She was a total loss.

== 31 January ==
List of shipwrecks: 31 January 1884
Ship	State	Description
Brunel	United Kingdom	The tug foundered in the North Sea. Her six crew took to a boat; they were rescued 36 hours later by the brig Cholmely (United Kingdom).
Champion	Canada	The barque was abandoned in the Atlantic Ocean (37°50′N 67°32′W) with the loss of eight of her thirteen crew. Survivors were rescued by the steamship Sirocco (United Kingdom). Champion was on a voyage from Baltimore, Maryland, United States to Hamburg, Germany.
Crescent	United Kingdom	The steamship collided with the steamship Donnai (France) and sank in the Dardanelles. Her crew were rescued by Donnai. Crescent was on a voyage from Sulina, Romania to Gibraltar.
Lathom	United Kingdom	The full-rigged ship was wrecked on the Longsand, in the North Sea off the coast of Essex. Six of her 26 crew were rescued by Faith (United Kingdom); the rest were rescued by a French smack. Lathom was on a voyage from Calcutta, India to London.

== Unknown date ==
List of shipwrecks: Unknown date in January 1884
Ship	State	Description
Acorn	United Kingdom	The steamship ran aground and sank at Aviles, Spain.
Adjutant	United Kingdom	The steamship was driven ashore at Fort Tigné, Malta. She was on a voyage from Calcutta, India to London.
Albert Edward	Royal National Lifeboat Institution	The Harwich Lifeboat capsized.
Alexandra	Austria-Hungary	The ship was driven ashore at Roquetas, Spain. She was on a voyage from Liverpool, Lancashire, United Kingdom to Fiume.
Annabella	United Kingdom	The ship was wrecked in the Orkney Islands. Wreckage came ashore near Rackwick, Hoy.
Ashton	United Kingdom	The barque was driven ashore at Saint John, New Brunswick, Canada.
Attielia	United Kingdom	The ship was driven ashore at Larne, County Antrim.
Attievita	Italy	The ship ran aground on the Bancho Bank, in the Loire. Her crew were rescued. She was on a voyage from Cardiff, Glamorgan, United Kingdom to the Cape Verde Islands. She was a total loss.
Augusta	Sweden	The schooner foundered at sea with the loss of two of her crew.
Auguste Anna	United Kingdom	The schooner was wrecked at Luarca, Spain. Her crew were rescued. She was on a voyage from Antwerp, Belgium to Luarca.
Ayrshire	United Kingdom	The steamship was driven ashore at Point Chef de Baie, Charente-Inférieure, France.
Bjornstjerna Bjornson	Flag unknown	The ship was driven ashore on the Horse Bank, in Liverpool Bay with the loss of a crew member. She was on a voyage from Charleston, South Carolina, United States to Liverpool.
Caearu	Spain	The ship was driven ashore at Port Talbot, Glamorgan. She was refloated on 29 January and taken in to Port Talbot in a severely leaky condition.
Carlo Mainetto	Italy	The barque was driven ashore and damaged at Westport, County Mayo, United Kingdom.
Danzing	United Kingdom	The steamship was driven ashore and damaged at Fusan, Joseon. She was refloated and taken in to Shanghai, China.
De Tvende Brodre	Norway	The ship was presumed to have foundered in the North Sea. Wreckage washed up on Terschelling, Friesland, Netherlands.
Dona Maria	United Kingdom	The schooner was run into by a smack and was abandoned by her crew, who were rescued by the smack Pet (United Kingdom). Dona Maria was on a voyage from "Bury" to West Hartlepool, County Durham.
Earl of Clarendon	United Kingdom	The schooner sank at Gourdon, Aberdeenshire. She was on a voyage from Sunderland, County Durham to Montrose, Forfarshire.
Elmirande	United States	The ship ran aground at New York. She was on a voyage from Singapore, Straits Settlements to New York.
Emma	(United Kingdom of Great Britain and Ireland) Jersey	The schooner collided with the pilot cutter No. 9 (Netherlands) and was run ashore at Dymchurch, Kent with the loss of her captain. Survivors were rescued by No. 9.
Emil	Flag unknown	The ship was abandoned in the Atlantic Ocean. Her crew were rescued. She was on a voyage from Swansea, Glamorgan to Saint John's, Newfoundland Colony.
Fastnet	United Kingdom	The tug ran aground in the Bute Channel, off the coast of Glamorgan, and sank.
Flower of Dart	United Kingdom	The smack sank in the North Sea. Two crew were rescued by the smack Queen of Ocean (United Kingdom).
G. P. Williams	United Kingdom	The ship was driven ashore at Islandmagee, County Antrim. She was on a voyage from Swansea to Larne.
Haab	Norway	The ship was driven ashore at Mochras, Caernarfonshire, United Kingdom. She was on a voyage from Liverpool to Valparaíso, Chile.
Hals	United Kingdom	The steamship sank near A Coruña, Spain. There were at least five survivors.
Hans Holmboe	Flag unknown	The ship was driven ashore and wrecked on the Skinburness Bank, off Silloth. Her crew were rescued.
Harkaway	United Kingdom	The steamship ran aground and was damaged at Garston, Lancashire.
Haura	United Kingdom	The schooner was wrecked on Stronsay, Orkney Islands.
Hawthorns	United Kingdom	The steamship ran aground on the Gunfleet Sand, in the North Sea off the coast of Essex. She was refloated on 27 January and sailed for London.
Hebe	United Kingdom	The schooner was driven ashore at Courtmacsherry, County Cork.
Herbert Beech	United Kingdom	The full-rigged ship was driven onto the Kaloot Bank, off the coast of Zeeland, Netherlands.
Herrington	United Kingdom	The ship ran aground on the Brake Sands. She was on a voyage from Whitby, Yorkshire to St. Ubes, Portugal. She was refloated and towed in to Ramsgate, Kent.
Hey my Nannie	United Kingdom	The smack foundered off King's Cross Point, Isle of Arran. Her crew survived.
Holland	Netherlands	The brig was wrecked at "Rykjobing".
Hwai-Yuen	China	The steamship was wrecked on the Hieshan Islands on or before 12 January. Five people were rescued; 199 people were reported missing. She was on a voyage from Shanghai to Hong Kong.
Island Belle	United Kingdom	The barque was driven ashore and wrecked at Veracruz, Mexico. Her crew were rescued.
Janie	Flag unknown	The ship was driven ashore and wrecked in the Tusket Islands, Nova Scotia, Canada. She was on a voyage from Bahia, Brazil to Halifax, Nova Scotia.
J. C. Trufant	United Kingdom	The full-rigged ship foundered at sea before 29 January. Her crew were rescued.
Jonathan Weir	Canada	The brigantine was driven ashore in Bideford Bay. Her crew were rescued. She was on a voyage from Newport, Monmouthshire, United Kingdom to Cuba.
Latona	United Kingdom	The barque was driven ashore on the coast of Florida, United States. She was on a voyage from Pensacola, Florida to Rotterdam, South Holland, Netherlands. She was refloated and had put in to Havana, Cuba in a leaky condition by 24 January.
Laurel	United Kingdom	The schooner was driven ashore in Rothiesholm Bay, Orkney Islands. Her crew were rescued.
Lida	Netherlands	The brig was driven ashore and wrecked near Hythe, Kent with the loss of all seven crew.
Lizzie	United Kingdom	The schooner was driven ashore on Flotta, Orkney Islands, Her crew were rescued.
Lizzie Burroughs	United Kingdom	The steamship was wrecked on Egilshay, Orkney Islands. Her crew were rescued.
Loch Ness	United Kingdom	The steamship was driven ashore 3 nautical miles (5.6 km) north of Montrose. She was on a voyage from Liepāja, Russia to Leith, Lothian. She was refloated on 8 January and resumed her voyage.
Lorne	United Kingdom	The brigantine was wrecked near Saint Thomas, Virgin Islands. Her crew were rescued.
Madras	United Kingdom	The ship was wrecked at Kirkcudbright. She was on a voyage from Pensacola, Florida, United States to Whitehaven, Cumberland.
Mary Hubert	Flag unknown	The steamship sank in a gale on Lake Superior.
Malembra	United Kingdom	The steamship was driven ashore on Sherbro Island, Sierra Leone. She was refloated.
Mameluke	Flag unknown	The steamship was driven ashore in the Suez Canal. She was on a voyage from Bombay, India to Marseille, Bouches-du-Rhône, France.
Marie Charlotte	France	The barque was driven ashore at Westport. She was on a voyage from San Francisco, California, United States to Westport.
Miningu	United Kingdom	The ship foundered in Cardigan Bay. Wreckage washed up at Criccieth and Harlech, Caernarfonshire and Barmouth, Merionethshire.
Minion	Norway	The barque was driven ashore and wrecked at Veracruz. Her crew were rescued.
Nereus	United Kingdom	The barque was driven ashore at Ainsdale, Lancashire. Her crew were rescued. Nereus was on a voyage from Barrow-in-Furness, Lancashire to Port Mackay, Queensland. She was refloated on 17 March, but had to be scuttled due to a severe list.
Ottawa	United Kingdom	The brigantine was driven ashore north of Lindisfarne, Northumberland.
Paul Revere	United States	The ship was driven ashore in the Alas Strait. She was refloated and put in to Manila, Spanish East Indies in a leaky condition.
Penda	Norway	The full-rigged ship was driven ashore on Terschelling. She was on a voyage from Larvik to Belfast, County Antrim. She was refloated and towed in to Terschelling.
Prima	Germany	The steamship was driven ashore at "Salvore", Sweden. She was on a voyage from Reval, Russia to London.
Providence	United Kingdom	The smack collided with the jetty and sank at Barton-upon-Humber, Lincolnshire. Her three crew survived. She was on a voyage from Hull, Yorkshire to Barton-upon-Humber.
Republic	Canada	The ship was driven ashore at Dymchurch, Kent, United Kingdom. She was on a voyage from Baltimore, Maryland, United States to Rotterdam. She was refloated with assistance from the tug Granville (United Kingdom) and towed in to Dover, Kent.
Royal Bluejacket	United Kingdom	The schooner sank off Penarth, Glamorgan. Her five crew were rescued by the tug Hazard (United Kingdom).
Royal Oak	United States	The schooner was lost at Louisbourg, Nova Scotia, Canada. Her crew were rescued.
Slavianska C.	Austria-Hungary	The brigantine was abandoned at sea. Her crew were rescued by the steamship Rochdale (United Kingdom). Slavianska C was on a voyage from Natal, Brazil to New York.
Strathlyon	United Kingdom	The steamship was driven ashore at Llandudno, Denbighshire.
Swatow	United Kingdom	The steamship was driven ashore and severely damaged near Ningbo, China.
Topsy	United Kingdom	The schooner collided with a dredger and sank at Hull. She was on a voyage from London to Hull.
Tre Ougini	Flag unknown	The ship caught fire and was abandoned off Cape São Roque, Brazil. Her crew were rescued.
Viatka	United Kingdom	The steamship was driven ashore at Torekov, Sweden. She was on a voyage from Burntisland, Fife to Liepāja. She was refloated with the assistance of a steamship and put in to Copenhagen, Denmark.
Widdrington	United Kingdom	The steamship was driven ashore at Saint John, New Brunswick. She was refloated.
Three unnamed vessels	Flags unknown	Two schooners and a smack were driven ashore on Bressay, Shetland Islands.
