= Richard Rush (disambiguation) =

Richard Rush (1780–1859) was an American lawyer, politician and diplomat.

Richard Rush may also refer to:

- Richard Rush (director) (1929–2021), American film director, scriptwriter, and producer
- Richard H. Rush (1825–1893), American military officer
- Dick Rush (1882–1956), Australian-born American character actor
- Stockton Rush (Richard Stockton Rush III, 1962–2023), American businessman, co-founder and chief executive officer of OceanGate
- USRC Richard Rush (1874), a Dexter-class cutter of the United States Revenue Cutter Service
