= Gladys Widdiss =

Native American leader and potter (1914–2012)

Gladys A. Widdiss

Wampanoag elder; President of the Aquinnah Wampanoag of Gay Head leader

Personal details
- Born: Gladys Malonson; October 26, 1914 Gay Head, Massachusetts
- Died: June 13, 2012 (aged 97) Vineyard Haven, Massachusetts
- Spouse: Leonard Widdiss
- Relations: Donald F. Malonson (brother) Thomas Manning (grandfather)
- Children: Donald, Carl, Dawn, and Marc
- Parent(s): William and Minnie (née Manning) Malonson
- Known for: Historian and potter, owned and operated the Howwasswee Trading Post
- Nickname(s): Wild Cranberry; Gladys Malonson

Gladys A. Widdiss (October 26, 1914 – June 13, 2012) was an American tribal elder, Wampanoag historian and potter. Widdis served as the President of the Aquinnah Wampanoag of Gay Head from 1978 until 1987. She then served as the vice chairman of the Aquinnah Wampanoag tribal council for many years.

== Biography ==
=== Early life ===
Widdiss was born Gladys Malonson in Gay Head, Massachusetts, on October 26, 1914, to William and Minnie (née Manning) Malonson. Her father was French Canadian. Her great-grandfather was a whaler named Thomas Manning. Her grandfather, also named Thomas, received an award for rescuing twenty survivors of the SS City of Columbus wreck in 1884. She and her brother, Donald Malonson, were raised at the family homestead near Lobsterville Road, which had been built by her great-grandparents., Thomas Manning and Rosabelle Howwasswee. Later in life, Donald Malonson would become the Chief of the Aquinnah Wampanoag of Gay Head.

Widdiss attended the Gay Head School and Tisbury High School in Vineyard Haven, Massachusetts, where she graduated as class valedictorian in 1932. She had hoped to attend Salem State College to become a teacher, but lack of money during the Great Depression led her to abandon those plans. Instead, she moved to Boston, where she found work making hospital gowns. She met and married her husband, Leonard Widdiss, a postal worker, soon after moving to Boston. Leonard D. Widdiss enlisted in the U.S. Marines during World War II and served in the Pacific theater. Gladys Widdiss took a position as an airplane dials painter during the war. The couple had children after the war. Widdiss split worked part-time at the former Jordan Marsh department store and an elementary school cafeteria in Wayland, Massachusetts. She next worked as a salesperson at Filene's in Boston from 1964 to 1981.

=== Aquinnah Wampanoag of Gay Head ===
A tribal elder and historian, Widdiss served as the President of the Aquinnah Wampanoag of Gay Head from 1978 to 1987. Under Widdiss presidency, the Wampanoags acquired the Gay Head Cliffs, the cranberry bogs surrounding Gay Head, and the Herring Creek. Aquinnah Wampanoag of Gay Head also received federal recognition from the Bureau of Indian Affairs in 1987 during her tenure in office. Widdiss had been instrumental in the movement to gain federal recognition for the tribe. She remained vice chairman of the Wampanoag tribal council for many years after leaving the presidency.

Her husband, Leonard Widdiss, died in 1987. Widdiss sold their home in Wayland, Massachusetts, and moved back to Martha's Vineyard, where she built a cottage on her family's homestead in Gay Head, soon becoming a full-time resident.

Widdiss had crafted clay objects to sell to tourists as a child, including cardholders, small lighthouses, and paperweights. She began making pottery again when she returned to Martha's Vineyard. Widdiss was one of the few people who received an official permit from Gay Head to collect and use colored clay from the Gay Head Cliffs. She baked her pieces in the sun, since a traditional kiln fades the natural colors of the Gay Head Cliffs clay. She included a cranberry as a signature of her designs, since her Wampanoag name was "Wild Cranberry." Her pottery has been displayed worldwide, including the Boston Children's Museum (where she was a member of the board of directors) and a bank in Kyoto, Japan. Most recently, Widdiss and her sons, Carl and Donald, owned and operated the Howwasswee Trading Post, a souvenir shop located at the Gay Head Cliffs; the shop was named for her great-grandmother, Rosabelle Howwasswee.

She contributed her biography to the Martha's Vineyard Museum Oral History Center in May 2011.

Gladys Widdiss died at Martha's Vineyard Hospital in Vineyard Haven, Massachusetts, on June 13, 2012, at the age of 97. She was survived by her three children, Donald, Carl and Dawn; two grandsons; and two great-children. She was predeceased by her husband and their son, Marc. She was buried at the Aquinnah cemetery.
