= Charles Emery =

Charles Emery may refer to:

- Charles Edward Emery (1838–1898), civil engineer
- Charles E. Emery, American football coach
