= Running Deer =

Running Deer may refer to:

- 100 metre running deer, a discontinued ISSF shooting event
- Running Deer (film), a 2013 short narrative film
- Dave Running Deer (fl. 1922–1923), American football player
- Jack Nason (1899–1977), aka Running Deer, American football player

== See also ==
- Chief Running Deer (disambiguation), a name for a Native American chief
- Running After Deer, 2008 album by Alix Lambert and Travis Dickerson
