= Chief Running Deer =

Chief Running Deer may refer to:

- Donald F. Malonson (1917–2003), Wampanoag tribe chief from Aquinnah, Massachusetts
- Fred Sasakamoose (born 1933), the first Canadian indigenous player in the National Hockey League (NHL)

== See also ==
- Running Deer (disambiguation)
