= USRC Gallatin (1871) =

Ship of the U.S. Revenue Cutter Service

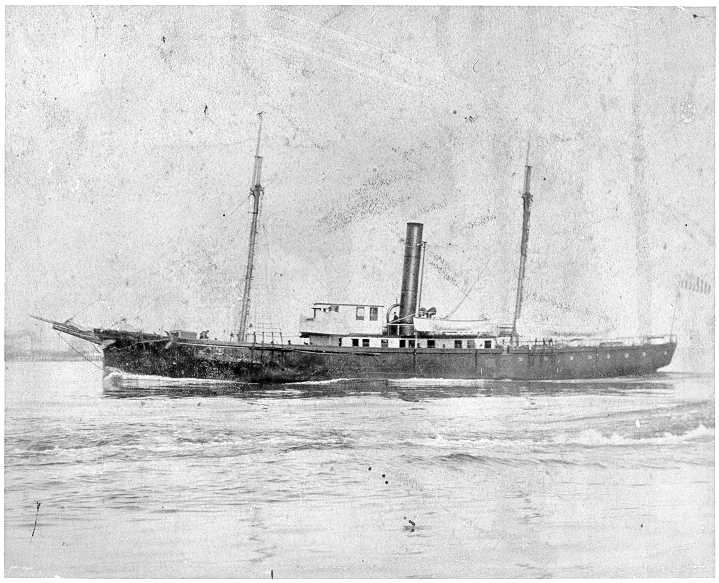
- USRC Gallatin

History

United States Revenue Cutter Service
- Name: USRC Gallatin
- Namesake: Albert Gallatin (1761–1849)
- Owner: U.S. Revenue Cutter Service
- Builder: David Bell Company, Buffalo, New York
- Cost: US$65,000
- Launched: 1871
- Commissioned: 1874
- Fate: Sank 6 January 1892

General characteristics
- Class & type: Gallatin–class
- Type: topsail schooner
- Displacement: 250 tons
- Length: 137 ft 0 in (41.76 m)
- Beam: 23 ft 6 in (7.16 m)
- Draft: 9 ft 4 in (2.84 m)
- Propulsion: Horizontal, direct-acting steam engine 34" diameter x 30" stroke, single boiler (1874) with Fowler steering propeller; (removed 1874)
- Complement: 7 officers, 33 enlisted
- Armament: 1 × 6-pounder gun

USRC Gallatin, was a Gallatin–class revenue cutter of the United States Revenue Cutter Service in commission from 1874 to 1892. The fourth ship of the Revenue Cutter Service to bear the name, she was named for the fourth U.S. Secretary of the Treasury, Albert Gallatin.

Named after President Thomas Jefferson's Secretary of the Treasury, the Gallatin was laid down by the David Bell Company at Buffalo, New York, in 1871 and commissioned in 1874. She was equipped with an iron hull and a Fowler patent steering propeller, a six-bladed screw with a separate engine for steering and reversing. Installed in October 1871, the Fowler propeller proved unsatisfactory and required reconstruction. On 4 October 1873, a sea trial of the reconstructed Fowler steering propeller proved to be uneconomical failure and a contract to make alterations was negotiated in March 1874. The Fowler propeller was replaced by the David Bell Company. Gallatin was finally ordered to Boston, Massachusetts, to begin patrol on 23 October 1874.

Gallatin was home-ported in Boston Harbor. She cruised the United States East Coast from Portsmouth, New Hampshire, to Holmes Hole, Massachusetts. Captain Gabrielson also skippered USRC Dexter when it came to the aid of City of Columbus which wrecked off Martha's Vineyard.

== Sinking ==
In the morning of 6 January 1892, Capt. Gabrielson was attempting to make the safety of Gloucester Harbor during a snowstorm and became disoriented. The cutter hit Boohoo Ledge hard.

The ships Carpenter Mr. J. Jacobson was killed instantly when he was struck by one of the toppling smokestacks. She sank on 6 January 1892, off the northwest side of Boohoo Ledge in the Atlantic Ocean off Manchester, Massachusetts, United States, with the loss of one life.

Her wreck is located at (42°33′50″N 70°44′52″W) in up to 50 ft (15 m) of water. The wreck was sold at auction as salvage for $679 roughly two months after the sinking.

== References used ==
- "Gallatin, 1871". Browse by Topic. U.S. Coast Guard Historian's Office.
- "Record of Movements, Vessels of the United States Coast Guard, 1790–December 31, 1933 (1989 reprint)" (PDF). U.S. Coast Guard Historian's Office.
- Canney, Donald L. (1995). U.S. Coast Guard and Revenue Cutters, 1790–1935. Naval Institute Press, Annapolis, Maryland. ISBN 978-1-55750-101-1.
