= Finis Terræ =

1929 film directed by Jean Epstein

- Directed by: Jean Epstein
- Written by: Jean Epstein
- Produced by: Serge Sandberg
- Starring: Jean-Marie Laot; Ambroise Rouzic
- Cinematography: Joseph Barthès; Gösta Kotulla; Louis Née; R. Tulle
- Edited by: Nicolas Delbart
- Production company: Société Genérale de films
- Release date: 19 April 1929
- Running time: 80 minutes
- Country: France
- Languages: Silent; French intertitles

Finis Terræ is a 1929 French silent drama film written and directed by Jean Epstein. The story centres on a small group of men harvesting seaweed off the coast of Brittany, and the problems which arise when one of them gets an infected thumb. The film's title is the old Latin name of the region Finistère, where the story is set, and means "End of the Earth". The film is shot in a documentary-like style, with local inexperienced actors in all roles, and frequent handheld camerawork. Also, Epstein often inserts slow motion footage.

== Plot ==
Finis Terræ (1929) by Jean Epstein

On the islet Bannec, off the coast of Brittany, four fishermen have set up camp for three months to harvest seaweed. If processed correctly, the ash of the seaweed can be sold for high prices. It is therefore burnt in several large piles on the island.

The two youngest fishermen, Ambroise and Jean-Marie, begin brawling when Ambroise drops Jean-Marie's only bottle of wine. Ambroise cuts his thumb on a piece of glass. After the quarrel, Jean-Marie cannot find his knife and believes Ambroise has stolen it. At work next day Ambroise starts to feel weak. He discovers that the thumb is infected and swollen. He does not tell the others about it; instead, his attempts to hide the injury makes them accuse him of laziness and immature behaviour. After a feverish night, Ambroise decides to sneak out and sail to Ushant to see a doctor, but the voyage fails due to low wind and a strong current. On his way back to the camp, Ambroise collapses on the beach.

On Ushant, people are concerned that only one plume of smoke is coming from Bannec. A disquieted group of fishermen's wives, parents and widows go to the island doctor and ask him to go to the islet, which he promises to do as soon as the tide allows. Meanwhile the other men on Bannec discover Ambroise on the beach and carry him to the camp. Jean-Marie suddenly finds his knife and realises he has judged Ambroise unfairly. He tries to convince the other men to bring Ambroise to Ushant, but is told that it is impossible without more wind. Jean-Marie then carries Ambroise to the boat. Struggling both with the boat and to keep Ambroise conscious, he sets out to get him to the doctor himself. At the same time, the doctor has enlisted a crew of volunteers and sets out to reach Bannec. A thick fog appears and both boats have a hard time seeing anything. Eventually, as they pass close to each other, Jean-Marie sees the doctor's boat and calls for it. The doctor hears the call. He boards Jean-Marie's boat and quickly lances Ambrose's thumb.

Ambroise is brought ashore at Ushant and put to bed. Jean-Marie visits him and tends him. The tired doctor receives a message about a sick man on the other side of the island and sets off.

== Production ==
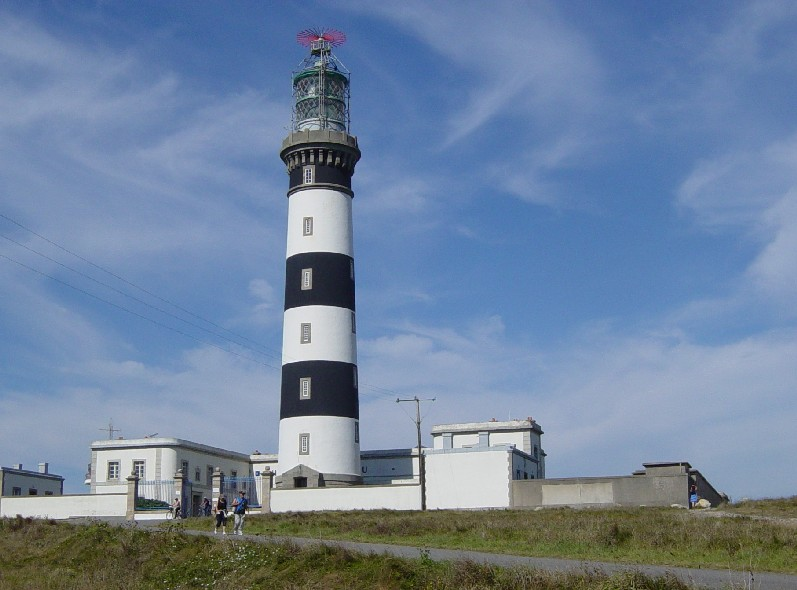
The lighthouse Phare du Creach in Ushant features in the film.

Jean Epstein had discovered the islands of Brittany soon before the production of Finis Terræ, and immediately became fascinated and impressed by both the environment and the local community of fishermen. The film was produced by Société Genérale de films. It was shot on location on the islands Bannec and Ushant, and starred local non-actors. It is supposedly based on actual events.

== See also ==
- 1929 in film
- Cinema of France
- Ethnofiction
- French Impressionist Cinema
