= Richard H. Rush =

American military officer (1825-1893)

Richard Henry Rush
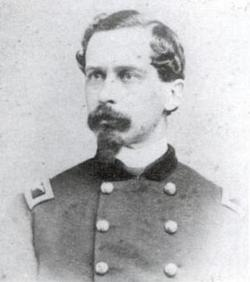
- Born: 14 January 1825; London, England, U.K.
- Died: 17 October 1893 (aged 68); Philadelphia, Pennsylvania, U.S.
- Burial place: Laurel Hill Cemetery, Philadelphia, Pennsylvania, U.S.
- Alma mater: United States Military Academy (1846)
- Relatives: Richard Rush (father); Benjamin Rush (brother); Benjamin Rush (grandfather)
- Military career
- Allegiance: United States (Union)
- Branch: United States Army (Union Army)
- Service years: 1846 – 1854; 1861 – 1864
- Rank: Colonel
- Commands: 70th Regiment of Pennsylvania Volunteers; 6th Pennsylvania Cavalry Regiment
- Conflicts: Mexican-American War; American Civil War; Battle of Hanover Court House; Battle of Gaines' Mill; Battle of White Oak Swamp; Battle of South Mountain; Battle of Antietam

Richard Henry Rush (January 14, 1825 - October 17, 1893) was an American military officer who served in the United States Army during the Mexican-American War and the Union Army during the American Civil War. He mustered and served as colonel in the 6th Pennsylvania Cavalry Regiment (known as Rush's Lancers) from October 1861 to September 1862.

== Early life and education ==
Rush was born on January 14, 1825, in London, England, to Richard Rush and his wife Catherine. He was born in London while his father served as minister to the Court of St. James's. Both his maternal and paternal grandfathers, Benjamin Rush and Richard Stockton, were signers of the United States Declaration of Independence. He attended the United States Military Academy and graduated 26th out of 59 students in 1846. His fellow graduates included future Civil War leaders from both sides of the war including A.P. Hill, Stonewall Jackson, George B. McClellan, George Pickett and George Stoneman.

== Career ==
On March 3, 1847, he was brevetted 2nd lieutenant in the Second Artillery and worked as an instructor of artillery and cavalry at West Point. He served in the Mexican-American War and was promoted to first lieutenant on December 6, 1847. After the war, Rush was stationed at Fort Columbus in 1848 and later at Fort Monroe from 1848 to 1850. From 10 December 1850 to 5 November 1852, he was a part of the Coast Survey and from 1852 to 1854, he was stationed at Fort McHenry. He resigned his commission on July 1, 1854.

=== American Civil War ===
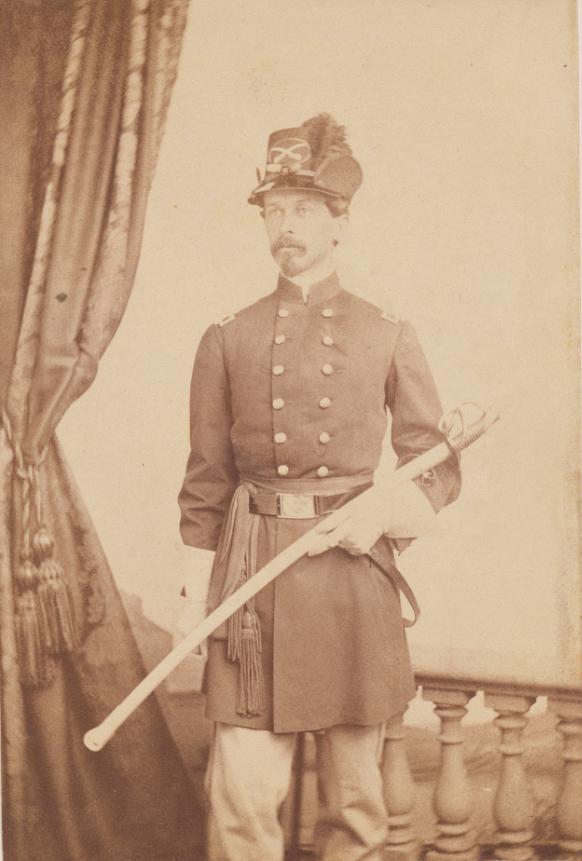
Colonel Rush in the 6th Pennsylvania Cavalry Regiment uniform and Pascal hat with cavalry insignia holding sword

In May 1861, after President Abraham Lincoln called for volunteer troops, Rush requested to be a brigadier general in charge of Pennsylvania Volunteer artillery forces but the request was not approved by Pennsylvania Governor Andrew Gregg Curtin. Rush was granted permission by the Governor to muster a cavalry regiment, the Philadelphia Light Cavalry, the 70th Regiment of Pennsylvania Volunteers, known also as "Rush's Lancers". The regiment consisted of many recruits from Rush's Germantown neighborhood in Philadelphia and the officers were Rush's personal friends. Rush was promoted to colonel on July 27, 1861, and the regiment was incorporated into the Army of the Potomac on October 5, 1861, as the 6th Pennsylvania Cavalry Regiment.

The regiment entered Virginia on March 10, 1862, and was attached to the Second Brigade, Cavalry Reserve led by William H. Emory. The regiment fought well at the Battle of Hanover Court House, capturing prisoners and serving as scouts and couriers. However, the unit was routed and driven from the field at the Battle of Gaines' Mill. During the Maryland campaign, he led the third brigade of the cavalry division under brigadier general Alfred Pleasonton. He received battle honors for service at the Battle of Hanover Court House, the Battle of Gaines' Mill, the Battle of White Oak Swamp, the Battle of South Mountain, and the Battle of Antietam. He took sick leave from the regiment on April 25, 1863, due to a relapse of malaria contracted during the Mexican-American War. Temporary command of the regiment was given to Robert Murray Morris. Despite being on sick leave, Rush was officially listed as colonel for the regiment until September 29, 1863, when command was given to Charles L. Leiper.

Rush was seconded to the Provost Marshal General's Bureau from 10 May – 10 November 1863. He helped organize the Veteran Reserve Corps and served at Rock Island Prison from November 10 – December, 20 1863. He served as President of a Board for Examination of Officers from January 3 – March 20, 1864. He resigned from the Army on July 1, 1864.

He died on October 17, 1893, in Philadelphia of heart failure and was interred at Laurel Hill Cemetery.

== Personal life ==
He was married twice and had six children.
