= 6th Pennsylvania Cavalry Regiment =

Union Army cavalry regiment

6th Pennsylvania Cavalry
- Pennsylvania flag
- Active: October 5th, 1861 – August 7th, 1865
- Country: United States
- Allegiance: Union
- Branch: Cavalry
- Engagements: Battle of Hanover Court House; Battle of Gaines' Mill; Battle of White Oak Swamp; Battle of South Mountain; Battle of Antietam; Battle of Fredericksburg; Stoneman's 1863 raid Battle of Brandy Station; Battle of Gettysburg; Battle of Bristoe Station; Battle of Mine Run; Battle of Yellow Tavern; Battle of Cold Harbor; Battle of Trevilian Station; Valley Campaigns of 1864; Siege of Petersburg; Battle of Five Forks; Battle of Sayler's Creek

The 6th Pennsylvania Cavalry was a Union Army cavalry regiment that served in the Army of the Potomac and the Army of the Shenandoah during the American Civil War. It was formed in 1861 as the Philadelphia Light Cavalry and the 70th Regiment of the Pennsylvania Volunteers by Richard H. Rush who also served as colonel from 1861 to 1862. At the request of Major General George B. McClellan, the regiment was equipped with lances which prompted the unit to be known as "Rush's Lancers." The lances proved ineffective in battle and the regiment was issued carbine rifles in 1863. The regiment served in many of the key battles in the Eastern theater of the American Civil War and were mustered out in August 1865.

== History ==
=== Formation of the regiment ===
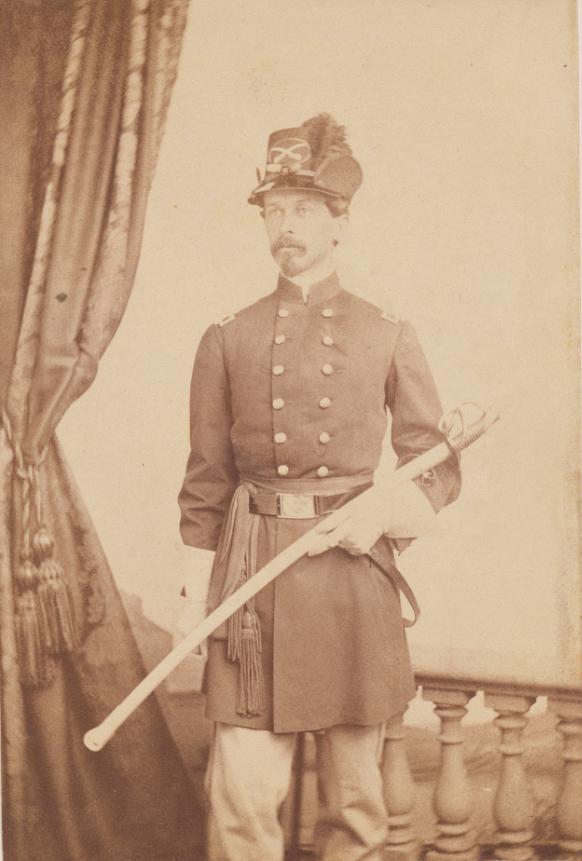
Colonel Richard H. Rush in regimental uniform and Pascal hat with cavalry insignia holding sword

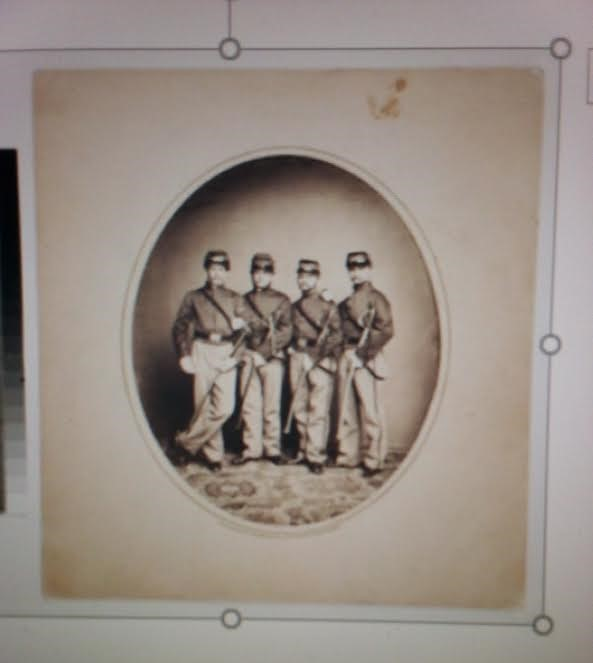
Corporals of the First Troop Philadelphia City Cavalry, 1861-2nd from left is Robert Morris V great-grandson of Robert Morris; Robert Morris V was a Major of Rush Lancers and died a POW in 1863;others are M. Edward Rogers, Charles F. Lennig, Robert E. Randall.”

In May 1861, after President Abraham Lincoln called for volunteer troops, Rush was granted permission by Pennsylvania Governor Andrew Gregg Curtin to muster a cavalry regiment originally named the Philadelphia Light Cavalry and the 70th Regiment of Pennsylvania Volunteers. The regiment consisted of many recruits from Rush's Germantown neighborhood in Philadelphia and the officers were Rush's personal friends. Rush was promoted to colonel on July 27, 1861. In August 1861, members of First Troop Philadelphia City Cavalry were organized into companies C and E. Company G was formed from a unit raised out of Reading, Pennsylvania, by George E. Clymer. The regiment had a total enrollment of 1,800 officers and enlisted men. The regiment was incorporated into the Army of the Potomac on October 5, 1861, as the 6th Pennsylvania Cavalry Regiment.

The regiment was armed initially with Colt army pistols and light cavalry sabers. At the suggestion of Major General George B. McClellan, the regiment was issued lances modeled after ones used by Napoleon Bonaparte's troops in France but never previously used by American troops. The lances were 9 ft (2.7 m) long with an 11 in (280 mm) long, three-sided blade. The regiment was known as "Rush's Lancers". After several weeks of training in Philadelphia, the regiment was transferred to Washington, D.C.

=== Peninsula campaign and Maryland campaign ===
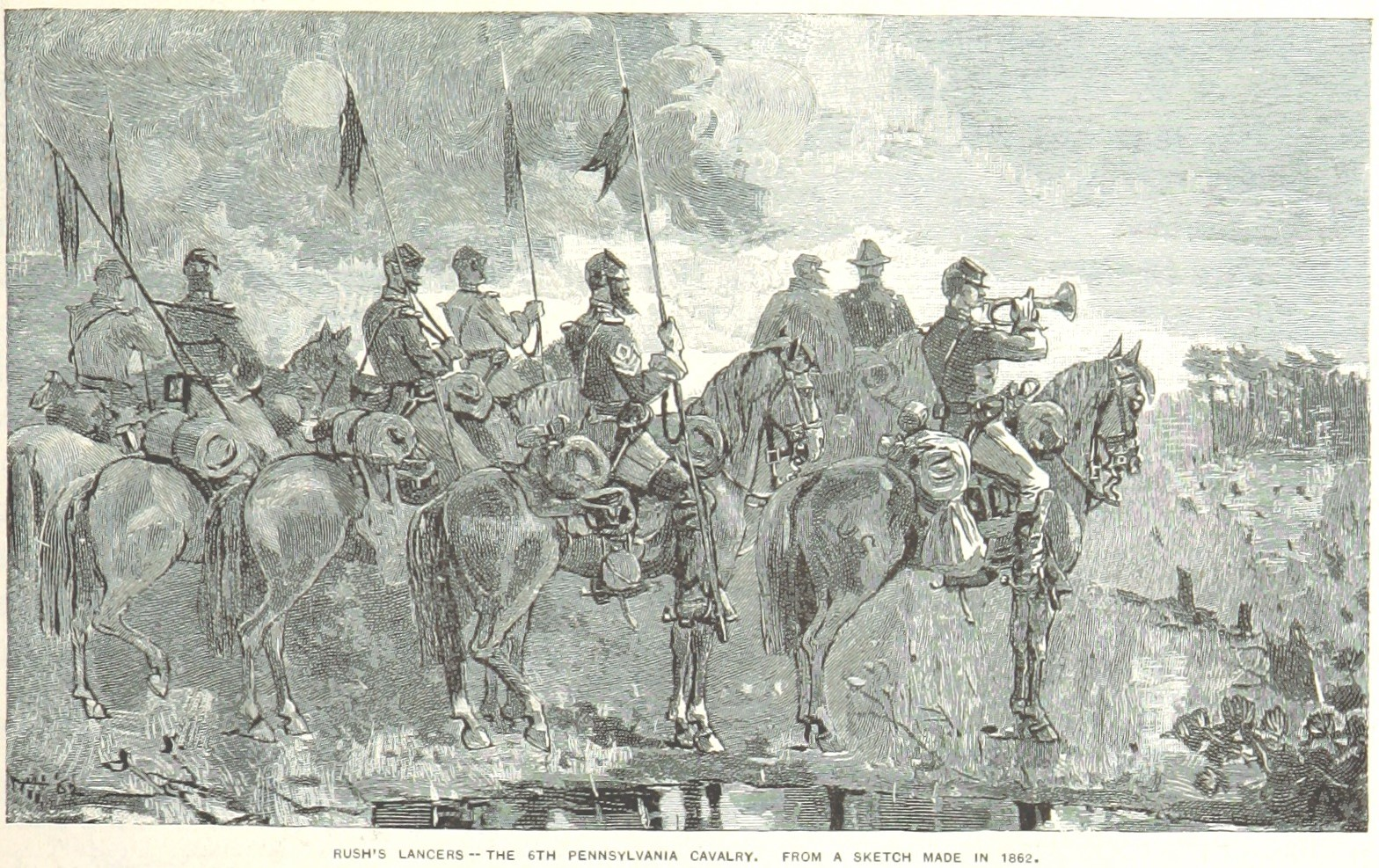
A sketch of the regiment in 1862

The regiment entered Virginia on March 10, 1862, and was attached to the Second Brigade, Cavalry Reserve led by William H. Emory. The regiment served during the Peninsula Campaign and Maryland Campaign. At the Battle of Hanover Court House they captured a company of infantry from North Carolina and served as scouts and couriers. However, the unit was routed and driven from the field at the Battle of Gaines' Mill.

The regiment also fought at the Battle of White Oak Swamp, the Battle of South Mountain, and the Battle of Antietam. Rush left the regiment for sick leave on April 25, 1863, due to a relapse of malaria contracted during the Mexican-American War. Temporary command of the regiment was given to Robert Murray Morris. Despite being on sick leave, Rush was officially listed as colonel for the regiment until September 29, 1863, when command was given to Charles L. Leiper.

During the Battle of Fredericksburg, it served as the provost guard for the Center Grand Division, guarding the bridges to the grand division's rear. The regiment also participated in Stoneman's Raid.

=== Battle of Brandy Station ===
In May 1863, the regiment retired their lances and were rearmed with Sharps carbines. The lances were ridiculed as "turkey drivers" and were ineffective in close combat. The regiment was assigned to the Reserve Brigade of the 1st Cavalry Division under brigadier general John Buford and fought in the Battle of Brandy Station in June 1863. The regiment led the unsuccessful charge (followed closely by the 6th Cavalry Regiment) against the guns at St. James Church. The regiment overran the confederate guns but were repulsed by the troops of brigadier general William E. Jones. Several Confederates later described the 6th's charge as the most "brilliant and glorious" cavalry charge of the war. (In many Civil War battles, cavalrymen typically dismounted once they reached an engagement and fought essentially as infantry. But in this battle, the surprise and chaos led to a mostly mounted fight.) The hard fighting at the battle forced Confederate officers to state that "Brandy Station made the Federal Cavalry".

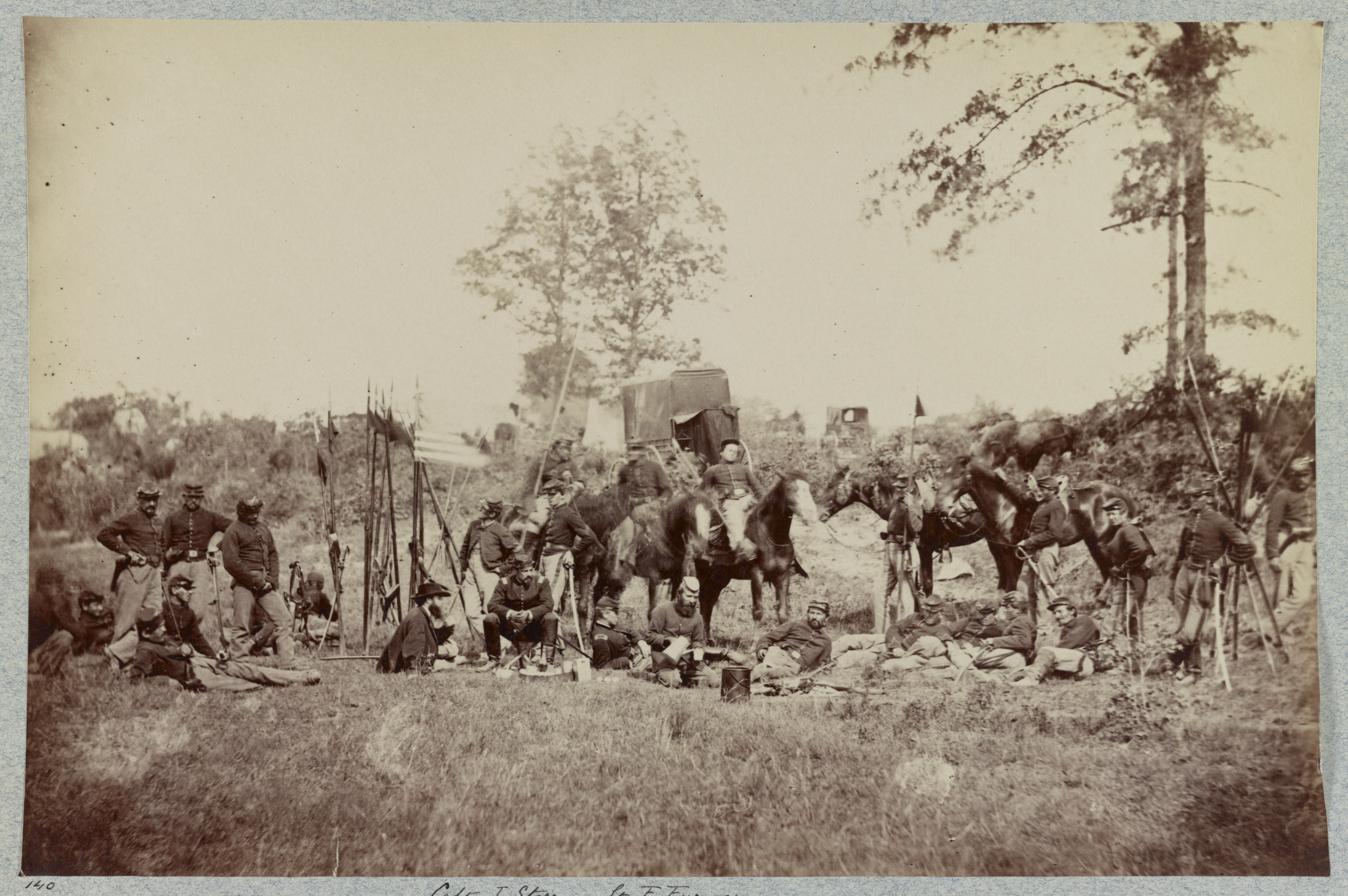
A photo of Company I, 6th Pennsylvania Cavalry, in Falmouth, Virginia, June 1863

The regiment arrived at the Battle of Gettysburg at night on July 2, 1863. They fought dismounted on July 3 and lost 12 men in the battle. The regiment also fought at the Battle of Mine Run.

In 1864, the regiment was transferred to the Army of the Shenandoah and fought in the Overland Campaign and in the Battle of Trevilian Station under general Philip Sheridan. In September, the regiment's original enlistments expired, and the unit was reorganized for an additional three years. Following the Appomattox Campaign, it was ordered to Washington, D.C., where it was consolidated with the 1st Pennsylvania Cavalry and 17th Pennsylvania Cavalry to form the 2nd Pennsylvania Provisional Cavalry. The combined regiment was sent to Louisville, Kentucky, where it was mustered out on August 7, 1865.

The 6th Pennsylvania Cavalry had one Medal of Honor Recipient: Captain Frank Furness, commander of Company F. On June 12, 1864, during the Battle of Trevilian Station, Furness "Voluntarily carried a box of ammunition across an open space swept by the enemy's fire to the relief of an outpost whose ammunition had become almost exhausted, but which was thus enabled to hold its important position," according to the citation for the medal, awarded on October 20, 1899.

== Casualties ==
- Killed and mortally wounded: 7 officers, 72 enlisted men
- Died of disease: 3 officers, 86 enlisted men
- Wounded (not mortally): 11 officers, 222 enlisted men
- Captured or missing: 6 officers, 204 enlisted men

== Commanders ==
- Colonel Richard H. Rush
- Lieutenant-Colonel John H. McArthur
- First Major C. Ross Smith
- Second Major Robert Morris
- Captain J. Hinckley Clark

== Legacy ==
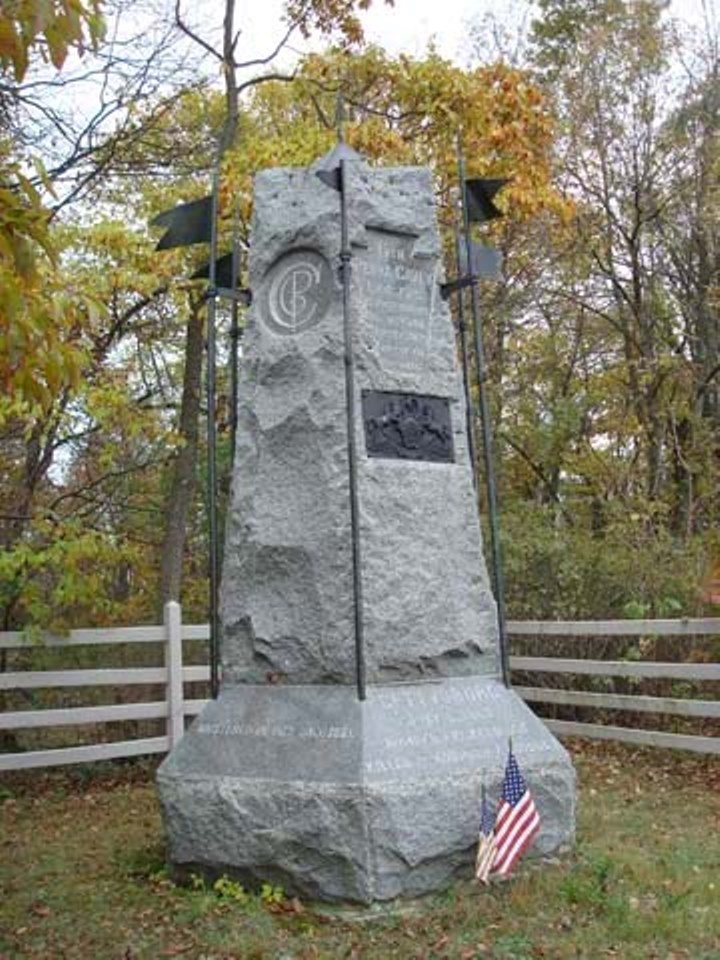
The monument to the 6th Pennsylvania Cavalry Regiment was erected at the Gettysburg battlefield in 1888 by the State of Pennsylvania

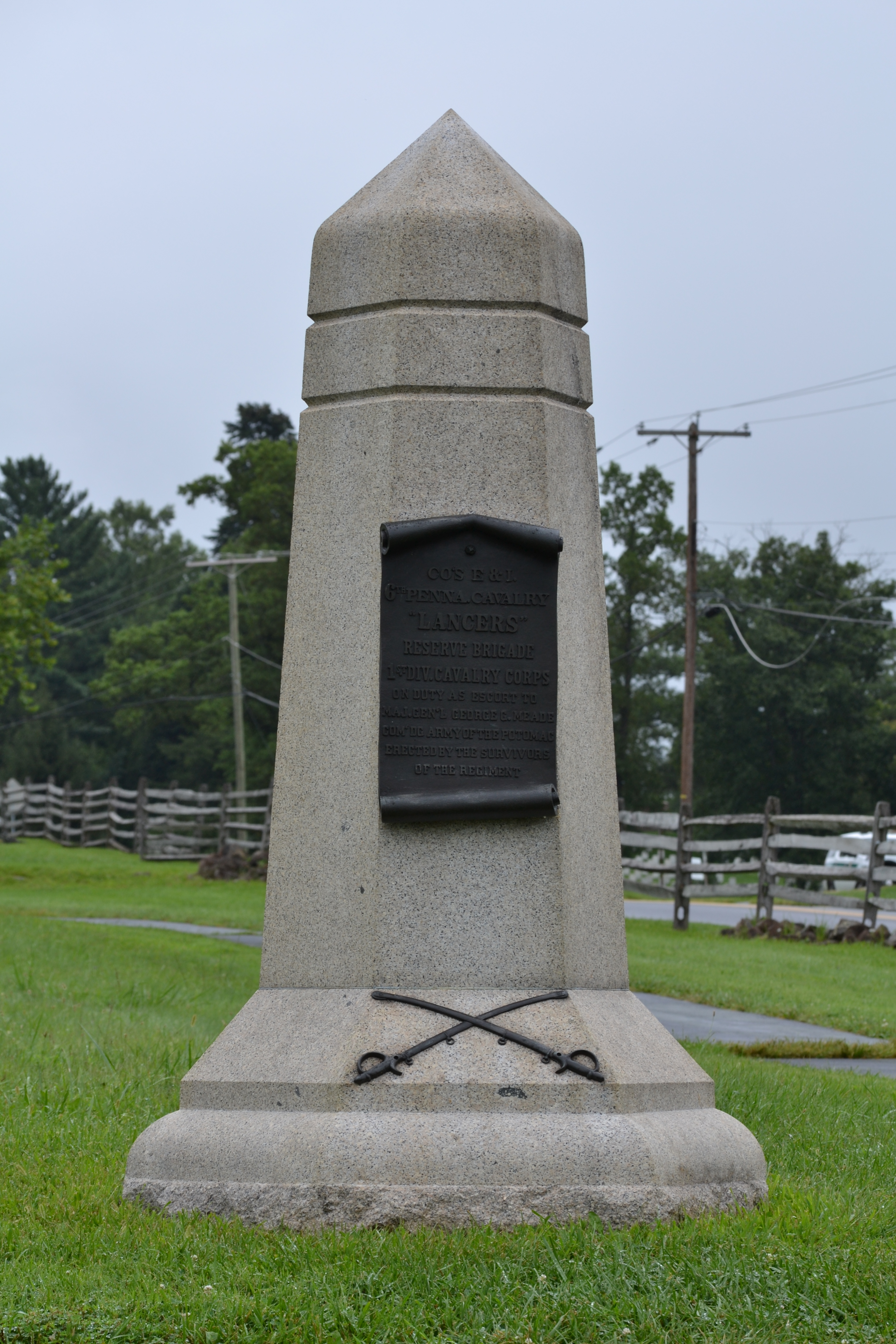
Monument to Companies E and I of the 6th Pennsylvania Cavalry Regiment

Two monuments to the 6th Pennsylvania Cavalry Regiment were placed at the Gettysburg battlefield. The main monument is a six-side granite monument with four lances and was erected in 1888 by the State of Pennsylvania. The second monument is dedicated to companies E & I of the regiment and represents their placement on the left flank of the Union Army at Emmittsburg Pike. A stone position marker shows the area of the left flank of the regiment on July 3 of the Battle of Gettysburg.

== See also ==
- List of Pennsylvania Civil War regiments
