= USRC Rush (1885) =

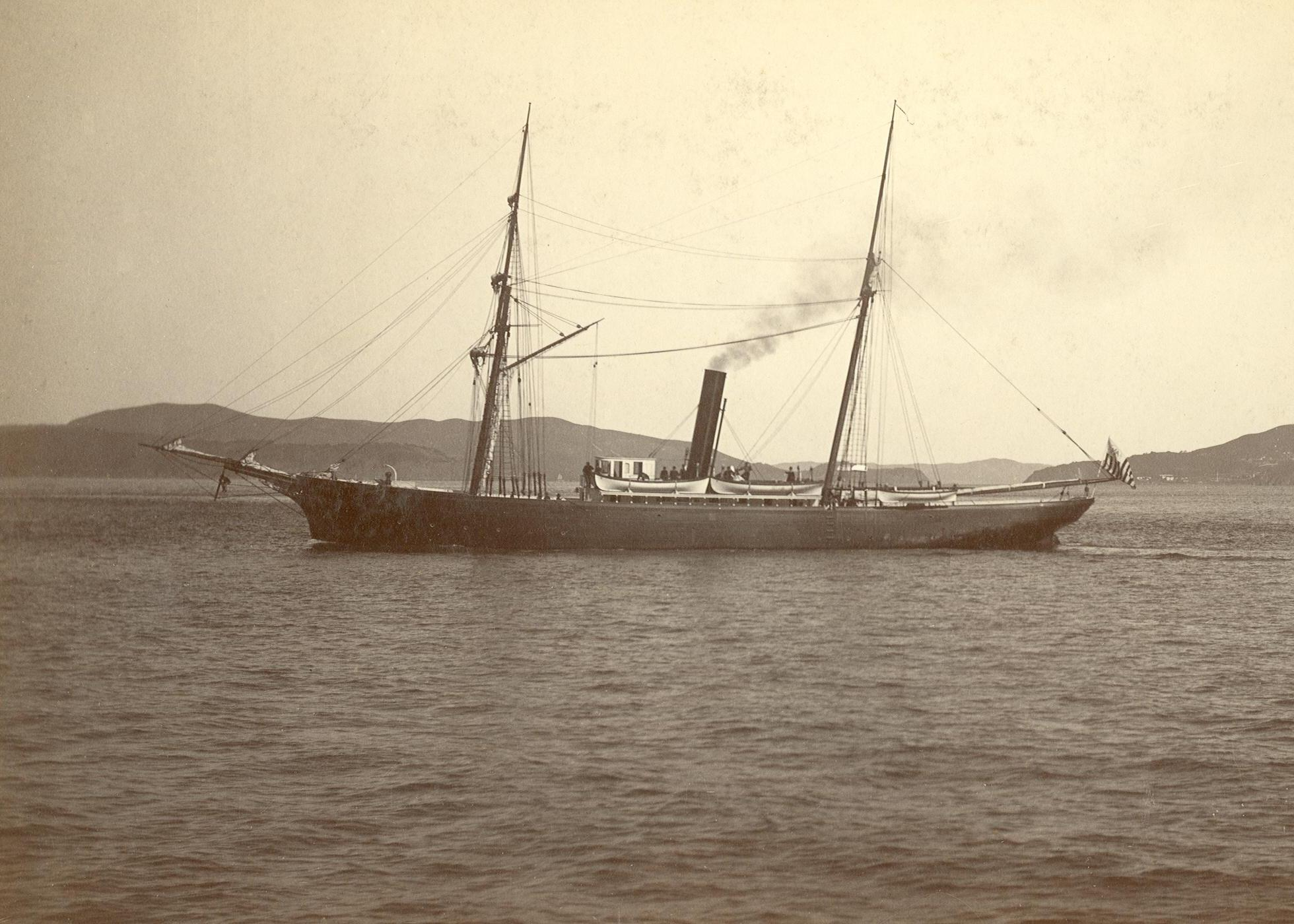
- USRC Richard Rush, on first mission, 2 January 1886

History

United States
- Name: USRC Rush
- Namesake: Secretary of the Treasury Richard Rush, and USRC Richard Rush (1874)
- Builder: Hall Bros., San Francisco, California
- Completed: 10 November 1885
- Commissioned: 1885
- Decommissioned: 30 September 1912
- Fate: Sold 22 January 1913 for $8500

General characteristics
- Type: Topsail schooner
- Tonnage: 300
- Length: 175 ft (53 m)
- Beam: 26 ft (7.9 m)
- Draft: 12 ft 6 in (3.81 m)
- Depth: 15 ft (4.6 m)
- Installed power: Compound expansion steam, 24.5" and 37" diameter x 27" stroke, 400 hp, single screw

USRC Rush was a revenue cutter named for Richard Rush, eighth Secretary of the Treasury. She was a replacement for USRC Rush and was much larger, but re-used the engine from the first Rush. She was completed in November 1885. In January 1886, soon after commissioning, she was assigned to search for the whaler Amethyst, last seen in the Bering Sea the previous October.

Rush spent her entire career on the Pacific ranging from the Bering Sea to Hawaii and San Diego, California performing customs duties, search and rescue, and law enforcement, including hosting judicial functions in furtherance of her enforcement of revenue and conservation laws. During the Spanish–American War in 1898 she was detached for duty with the United States Navy in the defense of the west coast, but returned to her duties with the Revenue Service later that year.

In 1899 she towed the newly commissioned river cutter USRC Nunivak to Alaska. She was decommissioned on 30 September 1912 and sold on 22 January 1913 to the Alaska Junk Company for $8,500.

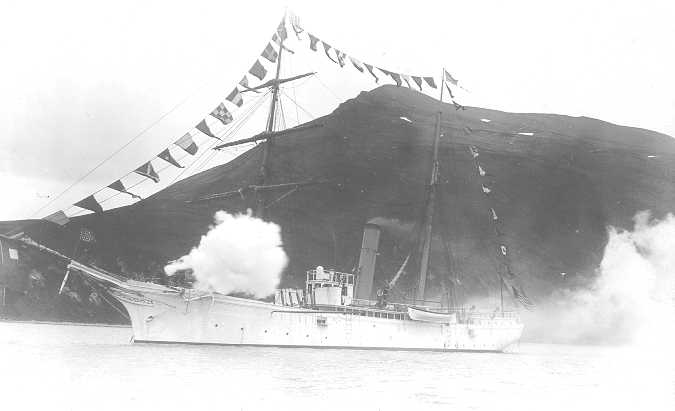
USRC Rush dressed overall at Sitka, District of Alaska, firing a salute on American Independence Day, July 4, 1901

== Sources ==
- Canney, Donald L. (1885), U.S. Coast Guard and Revenue Cutters, 1790–1935, Naval Institute Press ISBN 1-55750-101-7
