= Donald F. Malonson =

Native-American chief

Wampanoag leader
- Preceded by: Harrison Vanderhoop (Chief No-Ho-No)
- Succeeded by: F. Ryan Malonson

Personal details
- Born: July 25, 1917 Gay Head, Massachusetts
- Died: August 22, 2003 (aged 86) Vineyard Haven, Massachusetts
- Resting place: Gay Head Cemetery
- Spouse: Rachel P. ‘Pat’ (Ryan) Malonson
- Relations: Gladys Widdiss (sister) Thomas Manning (grandfather)
- Children: Horatio C. Thomas R. Bettina M. F. Ryan
- Parent(s): William and Minnie (née Manning) Malonson
- Known for: 1st Aquinnah Deputy Chief of Police, 1st Aquinnah Chief of Fire Department, Mechanic, Bus Driver, U.S Naval Construction Forces (Seabee), Chief of Wampanoag Tribe of Gay Head for over 50 years
- Nickname: Chief Running Deer

Donald F. Malonson (July 25, 1917 – August 22, 2003) was Chief of the Wampanoag Tribe of Gay Head (Aquinnah) from 1951-2003. In 1951, his uncle Harrison Vanderhoop, also known as Chief No-Ho-No, nominated Donald as his successor. Malonson symbolically led his people for the next 52 years.

== Biography ==
=== Early life ===
Born in Gay Head, Massachusetts to William and Minnie (née Manning) Malonson, his father was French Canadian. and his great-grandfather was a whaler named Thomas Manning. His grandfather, also named Thomas, received an award for rescuing twenty survivors of the SS City of Columbus wreck in 1884. He and his sister, Gladys Widdiss, were raised at the family homestead near Lobsterville Road, which had been built by their great-grandparents, Thomas Manning and Rosabelle Howwasswee.

=== World War II service ===
Donald only left Gay Head once — to serve in the 61st United States Naval Construction Battalion in the South Pacific during World War II. On the morning of Dec. 7, 1941 on his way to work, Donald learned of the bombings at Pearl Harbor. He enlisted before reporting to his job. After being sent to Camp Perry in Virginia for training, he shipped out of California with the 61st United States Naval Construction Battalion to serve in the Pacific. He traveled throughout the South Pacific and was honorably discharged on Oct. 10, 1945.

=== Chief of the Wampanoag Tribe of Gay Head (Aquinnah) ===
In 1951, his uncle Harrison Vanderhoop, also known as Chief No-Ho-No, nominated Donald as his successor. Malonson symbolically led his people for the next 52 years. Donald remarked about his role:

"I'm not political," he said. "The role of the chief is to be a patriarch and attend to powwows and tribal gatherings. More and more these days, if a tribe has a chief at all he's a figurehead. They now have presidents and councils - I represent the tribe, but stay out of the politics. He continued, "We are a woodland people, but a fishing tribe. Amos Smalley, a Gay Head Wampanoag, was the only man to ever actually harpoon and kill a white whale, a 90-footer, somewhere off the Azores in 1902. And Tashtego, the second harpooner in Moby-Dick, was a Gay Head Indian.""

Federal recognition of Wampanoag Tribe of Gay Head

In 1972, the Gay Head Tribal Council Inc. formed to pursue federal acknowledgement of the Wampanoag Tribe of Gay Head (Aquinnah). Chief Donald F. Malonson stated "it took the federal government more than $2 million to figure out who we were when we already knew who we were." After an arduous process, the tribe received federal recognition on April 10, 1987. Along with being granted tribal status, the Wampanoags were given back around 500 acres of tribal lands previously in the area called Gay Head. The Wampanoag tribe governs themselves with an elected Tribal Council, with traditional positions held by a chief (currently F. Ryan Malonson) and medicine man (currently Jason Baird), who maintain their status for life. Donald served as chief from 1951 to his death in 2003.
