= Benjamin Rush (lawyer) =

American lawyer & writer (1811–1877)

Benjamin Rush (January 23, 1811 – June 30, 1877) was an American lawyer and writer.

== Life ==
Benjamin Rush, grandson of the more famous Benjamin, and son of Richard Rush, was born in Philadelphia on January 23, 1811. He graduated from Princeton College in 1829; was admitted to the bar in 1833; became, in 1887, secretary of the United States legation in London, and for a time acted as chargé d'affaires there. He died in Paris on June 30, 1877.

== Works ==
- An Appeal for the Union (Philadelphia, 1860; 1861);
- Letters on the Rebellion (1862).

== Sources ==
- White, James Terry, ed. (1893). "Rush, Benjamin (2)". The National Cyclopaedia of American Biography. Vol. 3. New York: James T. White & Co. p. 333.
- Wilson, J. G.; Fiske, J., eds. (1900). "Rush, Benjamin (2)". Appletons' Cyclopædia of American Biography. Vol. 5. Rev. ed. New York: D. Appleton & Co. p. 350.
