= Amos Smalley =

Native American whaleman

Amos Peters Smalley
- Born: 1877; Gay Head (now Aquinnah, Massachusetts), U.S.
- Died: 1961 (aged 83–84)
- Resting place: Aquinnah Town Cemetery
- Occupations: Whaler, Fisherman, Fish Peddler
- Known for: Harpooning a white whale
- Spouse: Addie Smalley

Amos Peters Smalley (1877–1961) was a Native American whaler, fisherman, and fish peddler.

== Life ==
As a member of the Wampanoag Tribe, Amos first went to sea on a whaler at the age of fifteen. This was not unusual; in fact, the Wampanoags of Martha's Vineyard were renowned and highly desired mariners due to their exceptional seamanship.

As a young man, Amos worked as a whaleman. When his whaling days were over, he worked as a fishermen and, until his death at 84, a fish peddler.

== White whale ==
In 1902, Amos set sail on the New Bedford based bark Platina. While sailing south of the Azores, Walter Thompson, a boy aboard the Platina, spotted an alleged 90-foot white whale from the masthead. After tracking it down in a whaleboat with a small crew, Amos, using a darting gun, struck the white sperm whale and killed it with a bomb lance. According to those aboard, the large, old whale yielded a high amount of high quality whale oil.

Amos said of the whale:

"It was 90 feet long, 3 times the length of the boat, and he was unnatural."

Although Smalley's great white whale came fifty-one years after Herman Melville wrote Moby-Dick in 1851, the similarities between the Melville character Tashtego and Smalley are notable. In fact, Smalley was invited to the opening of the movie "Moby Dick." Melville described Tashtego as follows:

"an unmixed Indian from Gay Head, the most westerly promontory of Martha's Vineyard, where there still exists the last remnant of a village of red men, which has long supplied the neighboring island of Nantucket with many of her most daring harpooneers. In the fishery, they usually go by the generic name of Gay-Headers."

Later in his life, much interest surrounded Amos and his white whale tale. In 1956, Reader's Digest published an article written by Max Eastman titled: 'I Killed "Moby Dick"' in its June issue. In 1957, A New Bedford Standard Times article reported on the article, stating that Mr. Smalley was compensated, having received $2,500 from Reader's Digest for his story. The newspaper article described Amos's adventure as follows:

"Smalley stepped into a 30-foot whaleboat, commanded by the mate, Andy West. This was the boat that was to 'go on the whale.' As they drew near the whale, which was 90 feet long, West spoke in a voice Smalley will never forget: 'That fish is white! He's white all over. Give it to him!'

"Smalley gave it to him. He got his iron into the great mammal, and the small bomb that trailed it. Finally he heard the bomb explode, the muffled "pung pung" far down inside the creature. Then the whale nearly pulled the boat under. " 'Suddenly,' Smalley says, 'his whole head broke water, the line jerked so it took all of us to hold it, and the air was filled with heavy roar, as thick red blood gushed from his spout-hole.'

"The mate went forward with the shoulder gun ready for more tricks. But there weren't any. 'Smalley,' the mate said, 'you done well. You put your iron right over his heart. You killed him.' "

In her book Moshup's Footsteps, Wampanoag historian Helen Manning describes her uncle Amos. Manning recounts how Smalley described when he saw the Great White Whale, he remembered the story of the last great Sachem of Aquinnah - Mittark and how Mittark, on his death bed, warned of strangers coming to Aquinnah. As a sign of his prophecy, he said a great white whale would rise out of Witch Pond. Amos further described how when Moshup took leave of Aquinnah, he dug a secret tunnel from the cliffs to Witch Pond, so his pet white whale could seek safety and refuge. According to Manning, a tradition continues that when fog is seen over Witch Pond or felt in the air, Wampanoags say that the White Whale is spouting her plume.
