= Richard Rush =

American lawyer, politician and diplomat (1780–1859)

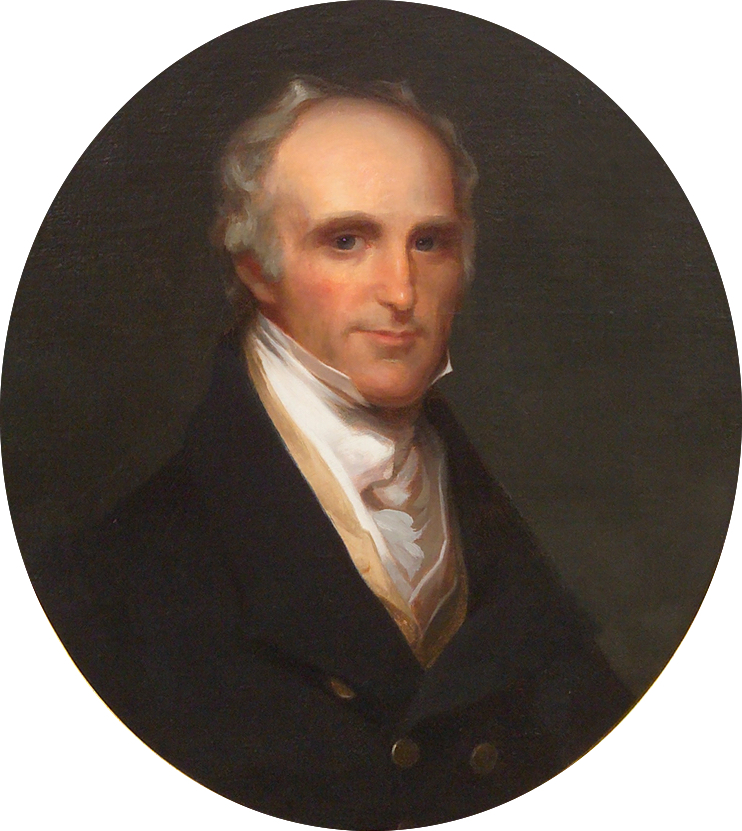

17th United States Minister to France
- In office July 31, 1847 – October 8, 1849
- President: James Polk; Zachary Taylor
- Preceded by: William King
- Succeeded by: William Rives

8th United States Secretary of the Treasury
- In office March 7, 1825 – March 5, 1829
- President: John Quincy Adams; Andrew Jackson
- Preceded by: William Crawford
- Succeeded by: Samuel Ingham

8th United States Minister to the United Kingdom
- In office February 12, 1818 – April 27, 1825
- President: James Monroe; John Quincy Adams
- Preceded by: John Quincy Adams
- Succeeded by: Rufus King

Acting United States Secretary of State
- In office March 10, 1817 – September 22, 1817
- President: James Monroe
- Preceded by: John Graham (acting)
- Succeeded by: John Quincy Adams

8th United States Attorney General
- In office February 10, 1814 – November 12, 1817
- President: James Madison; James Monroe
- Preceded by: William Pinkney
- Succeeded by: William Wirt

Comptroller of the Treasury
- In office 1811–1812
- President: James Madison

Attorney General of Pennsylvania
- In office January 26, 1811 – December 13, 1811
- Governor: Simon Snyder
- Preceded by: Joseph Reed
- Succeeded by: Jared Ingersoll

Personal details
- Born: August 29, 1780 Philadelphia, Province of Pennsylvania, British America
- Died: July 30, 1859 (aged 78) Philadelphia, Pennsylvania, U.S.
- Resting place: Laurel Hill Cemetery, Philadelphia, Pennsylvania, U.S.
- Party: Federalist (before 1830); National Republican (1830–1834); Democratic (1834–1859)
- Spouse: Catherine Rush
- Children: Benjamin Rush; Richard H. Rush
- Relatives: Benjamin Rush (father); James Rush (brother)
- Education: Princeton University (BA)
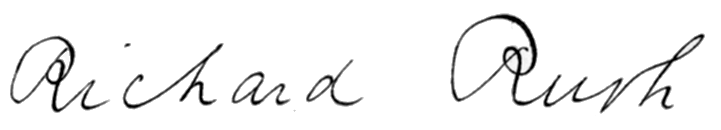
- Signature

Richard Rush (August 29, 1780 – July 30, 1859) was an American lawyer, politician and diplomat who served as the 8th United States Attorney General from 1814 to 1817 and the 8th United States Secretary of the Treasury from 1825 to 1829. He served as John Quincy Adams's running mate on the National Republican ticket during the 1828 United States presidential election.

He served as Attorney General of Pennsylvania in 1811 and as Comptroller of the Treasury during the James Madison administration. Rush became one of Madison's closest advisers during the War of 1812 and Madison elevated him to United States Attorney General in 1814. Rush remained in that position after James Monroe took office. He served as the acting Secretary of State briefly in 1817 and negotiated the Rush–Bagot Treaty, which limited naval forces on the Great Lakes.

Rush served as the ambassador to Britain from 1818 to 1825. He negotiated the Treaty of 1818 which set the boundary between the U.S. and Canada and had discussions with George Canning that led to the announcement of the Monroe Doctrine. He served as minister to France from 1847 to 1849. He helped establish and served on the board of regents for the Smithsonian Institution. He was the last surviving member of the Madison and Monroe Cabinets.

== Early life and education ==
Rush was born on August 29, 1780, in Philadelphia, Pennsylvania. He was the second son, and third child, of Benjamin Rush and Julia (Stockton) Rush, daughter of Richard Stockton and Annis Boudinot Stockton. He entered the College of New Jersey (now known as Princeton University) at the age of 14, and graduated in 1797 as the youngest member of his class. He studied law in the practice of William Lewis and was admitted to the bar in 1800.

Rush married Catherine Eliza Murray on the fall of 1809. They were the parents of eleven children including the lawyer and writer Benjamin Rush and Union Army colonel Richard H. Rush.

== Career ==
As a lawyer, Rush first gained attention with a speech he gave which condemned HMS Leopard's attack on the USS Chesapeake during the Chesapeake-Leopard affair. In 1811 he was appointed Attorney General of Pennsylvania. He successfully acquitted William Duane in a libel suit brought forth by the Pennsylvania Governor Thomas McKean. His popularity prompted an offer to run for Congress but he declined. In November 1811, President James Madison appointed Rush Comptroller of the Treasury.

From the position as Comptroller of the Treasury, albeit a subordinate position, Rush functioned as one of President Madison's closest friends and confidential advisors throughout the War of 1812. Rush was on the field of battle along with Madison during the Battle of Bladensburg. He was one of the war hawks who advocated war with Britain. In 1814 Madison offered Rush the choice of Secretary of the Treasury or Attorney General of the United States, and Rush chose Attorney General.

With his appointment as Attorney General, Rush became the youngest person to serve in that office. Rush served as United States Attorney General from 1814 to 1817. At this time the attorney generalship was a part-time position, and so Rush also maintained his private law practice while in this office. He edited Laws of the United States, which codified all the federal statutes implemented between 1789 and 1815. He was acting Secretary of State briefly in 1817. During this time Rush concluded the Rush-Bagot Convention, which demilitarized the Canadian boundary on the Great Lakes.

In October 1817, Rush was appointed Minister to Britain to succeed John Quincy Adams, who had taken the position of Secretary of State upon his return. He remained in Britain for almost eight years, and negotiated a number of important treaties, including the Treaty of 1818. In 1823, Rush negotiated with George Canning over British proposals that the two countries issue a joint declaration against French support for Spain during the Spanish American wars of independence, though Canning refused to agree to Rush's demands for a joint recognition of the newly independent Latin American republics, leading to the separate American declaration of the Monroe Doctrine. He wrote about his experience as Minister to Britain in A Residence in the Court of St. James.

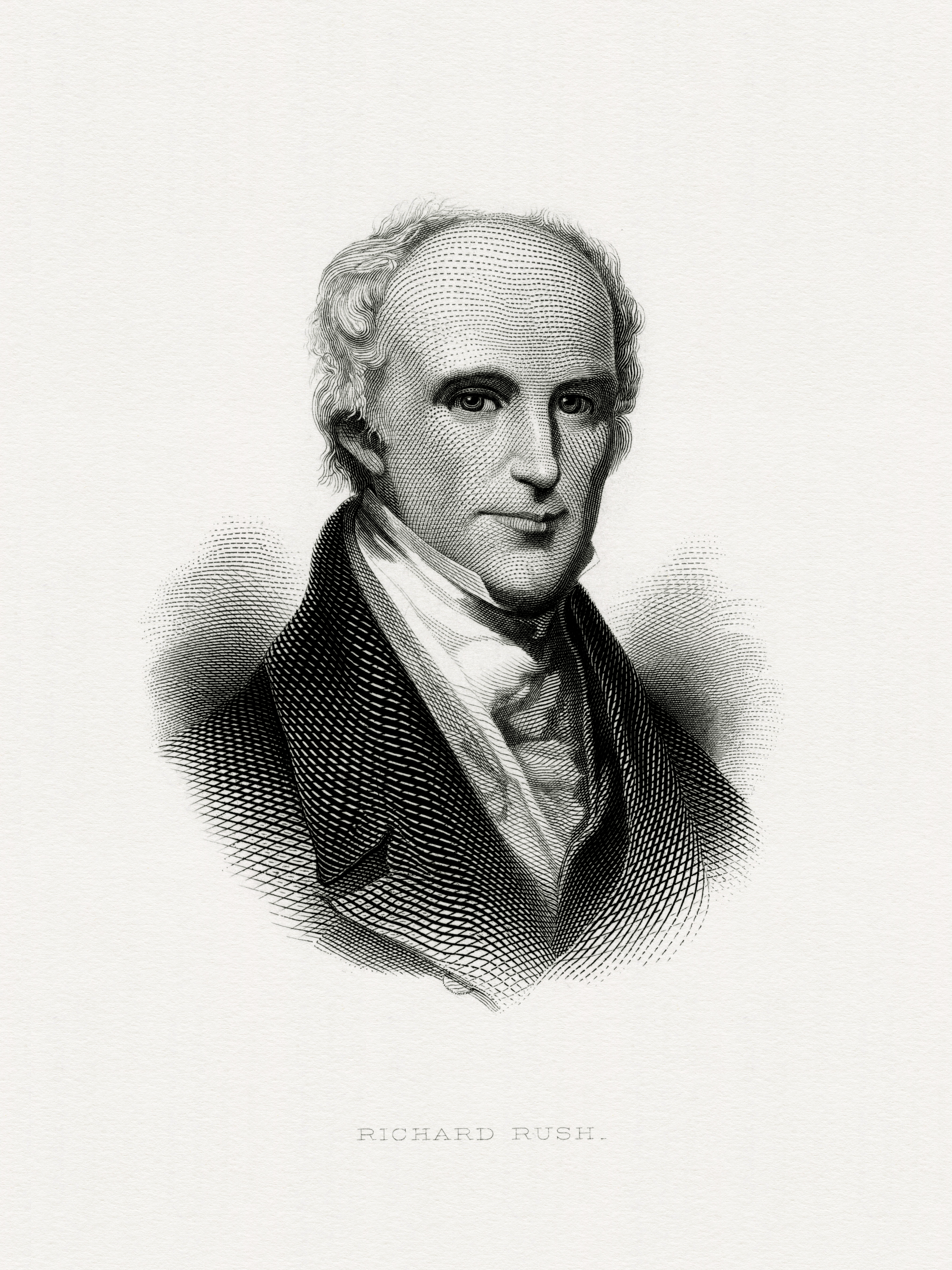
Bureau of Engraving and Printing portrait of Rush as Secretary of the Treasury.

Upon the election of John Quincy Adams in 1825, Rush (having made a study of Britain, and the Royal Navy in particular, while he was there) desired to become the Secretary of the Navy. Adams, however, immediately nominated him for the post of Secretary of the Treasury, which he accepted. In 1828, he was a candidate for Vice President on the re-election ticket with John Quincy Adams, but was defeated.

In 1829, he went overseas at the behest of the cities of Alexandria, Virginia, and Georgetown, to secure funds for the construction of a canal connecting the Chesapeake Bay and the Ohio River. In 1836, President Andrew Jackson sent him to England as Commissioner to secure for the United States the legacy left the government by James Smithson. He was successful in this undertaking, bringing to this country the sum of $508,318.46, which would eventually be used to establish the Smithsonian Institution in Washington, D.C. Rush later became one of the first regents of the institution.

After a short time with the Anti-Masonic Party, in the later 1830s Rush became a member of the Democratic Party. He was opposed to anti-slavery sentiments because he believed they threatened the stability of the Union. In 1847, Richard Rush was appointed as Minister to France by President James K. Polk. When his negotiations were interrupted by the overthrow of King Louis-Philippe, he was among the first foreign diplomats to recognize the new French Second Republic.

=== Societies ===
Rush was elected a member of the American Antiquarian Society in 1814. In 1817, Rush elected a member of the American Philosophical Society. During the 1820s, Rush was a member of the prestigious society, Columbian Institute for the Promotion of Arts and Sciences, who counted among their members former presidents Andrew Jackson and John Quincy Adams and many prominent men of the day, including well-known representatives of the military, government service, medical and other professions.

== Death and legacy ==
He died in Philadelphia on July 30, 1859, and was interred at Laurel Hill Cemetery in Philadelphia.

Five United States Coast Guard vessels were named in his honor:

- USRC Richard Rush 1831 Morris-Taney class cutter
- USGC Richard Rush 1874 Dexter-class cutter
- USRC Rush 1885 revenue cutter,
- USS Rush II (WSC-151) 1927 cutter
- USCGC Rush (WHEC-723) 1969 Hamilton-class cutter

The USCGC Rush (WMSM-918) Heritage-class cutter is under construction and scheduled for delivery in 2026.

== Publications ==
- Thoughts on the Administration of Justice in Pennsylvania., Philadelphia: Hopkins and Earle, 1809
- Memoranda of a Residence at the Court of London, Philadelphia: Carey, Lea & Blanchard, 1833
- Two Letters on Public Subjects., Philadelphia: L.R. Bailey, Printer, 1851
- Washington in Domestic Life. From Original Letters and Manuscripts., Philadelphia: J.B. Lippincott and Co., 1857

Legal offices
Preceded by William Pinkney	United States Attorney General; 1814–1817	Succeeded by William Wirt
Diplomatic posts
Preceded by John Quincy Adams	United States Minister to the United Kingdom; 1818–1825	Succeeded by Rufus King
Preceded by William King	United States Minister to France; 1847–1849	Succeeded by William Rives
Political offices
Preceded by William Crawford	United States Secretary of the Treasury; 1825–1829	Succeeded by Samuel Ingham
Party political offices
New political party	National Republican nominee for Vice President of the United States; 1828	Succeeded by John Sergeant
