= Dave Running Deer =

No. 16
- Position: End / Fullback / Halfback

Career information
- College: Haskell Indian

Career history
- Oorang Indians (1922–1923)

David Running Deer was a professional football player during the early years of the National Football League. During his two-year career, Dave played in 5 games with the Oorang Indians. He played in 2 games for the 1922 season and in 3 games for the 1923 season. He ended his professional career after the Indians disbanded in 1923.
