= USRC Dexter (1874) =

Ship of the U.S. Revenue Cutter Service

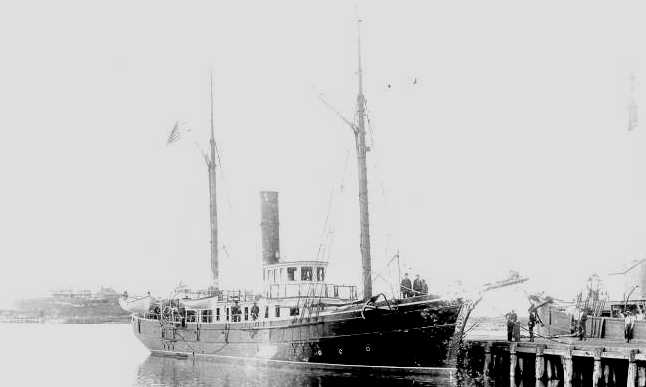
- USRC Dexter

History

United States Revenue Cutter Service
- Name: USRC Dexter
- Namesake: Secretary of the Treasury Samuel Dexter
- Operator: U.S Revenue Cutter Service
- Builder: Atlantic Works Company, Boston, Massachusetts
- Acquired: 6 June 1874
- Commissioned: 18 June 1874
- Decommissioned: 1908
- Fate: Sold 18 July 1908

General characteristics
- Class & type: Dexter-class cutter
- Displacement: 188 tons
- Length: 143 ft 6 in (43.74 m)
- Beam: 23 ft 0 in (7.01 m)
- Draft: 9 ft 6 in (2.90 m)
- Propulsion: Steam, 26.25 in (66.7 cm) dia x 36 in (91 cm) stroke, single screw
- Sail plan: Schooner-rigged
- Complement: 7 officers, 33 enlisted
- Armament: 2 guns, type unknown

USRC Dexter was a Dexter-class cutter of the United States Revenue Cutter Service in commission from 1874 to 1908. She was the second ship of the Revenue Cutter Service to bear the name. The other Dexter-class cutters, all commissioned in 1874, were Dallas and Rush. Dexter was built by the Atlantic Works Company at Boston, Massachusetts. Captain John A. Henriques accepted her for service on 6 June 1874, and she was commissioned into the Revenue Cutter Service on 18 June 1874. Her role in the rescue of passengers from the sinking SS City of Columbus under winter gale winds brought her nationwide popular acclaim.

== Early service ==
Dexter was stationed at Newport, Rhode Island. She patrolled the Long Island Sound and east to Nantucket, Massachusetts, enforcing customs laws, patrolling regattas, and assisting mariners in distress, among other duties. She also made annual winter cruises as directed, usually off Edgartown, Massachusetts to Nantucket Shoals, and from Gay Head, Massachusetts, to Sandy Hook, New Jersey.

== Rescue of SS City of Columbus ==
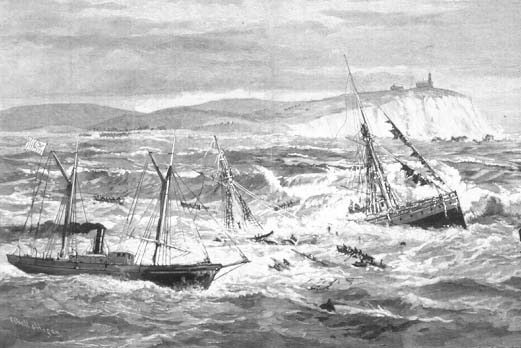
City of Columbus and Revenue Cutter Dexter Schell and Hogan, 1884

In the early morning hours of 18 January 1884, SS City of Columbus out of Boston, Massachusetts bound for Savannah, Georgia ran aground on rocks near Martha's Vineyard. Due to high winds and cold weather, only a few lifeboats were able to be launched and most of them contained members of the crew rather than passengers. No help arrived on scene for more than five hours, with the first help coming from lifeboats manned by Massachusetts Humane Society volunteers of Wampanoag American Indians from Gay Head. They managed to rescue 19 persons from the cold water with only one person dying afterward. Dexter arrived on scene at 1230 and spotted men clinging to the masts and rigging of City of Columbus. Captain Eric Gabrielson ordered the cutter's gig launched for a rescue attempt. Lieutenant Charles D. Kennedy and four volunteers rescued the captain of the sunken steamer and four of his men that had been clinging to the rigging for twelve hours. Second Lieutenant John U. Rhodes managed to save two men and recovered the bodies of others that were frozen to the rigging after several attempts. City of Columbus had left Boston with 45 officers and crew and 87 passengers, only 17 crew members and 12 passengers survived the ordeal. Rhodes was awarded a gold medal from the Humane Society for his efforts as well as a gold medal from the German-American Society of Wilmington, North Carolina. Silver medals were awarded by the Humane Society for Captain Gabrielson and Lieutenant Kennedy. The Wampanoag volunteers and the crew of Dexter were thanked in a joint resolution by Congress for their "brave and humane conduct". The Connecticut legislature passed a resolution praising the crew of Dexter. Public subscriptions rewarded Rhodes with $2053 and the Wampanoag lifesavers $3,500. Rhodes split his reward with the officers and crew of Dexter, giving each officer $150 and each crewman a new uniform, mattress and bedding.

== Spanish–American War and later service ==
At the beginning of the Spanish–American War in April 1898 the Revenue Cutter Service was transferred to the control of the U.S. Navy by executive order and the U.S. Army asked the Navy to provide protection to Army shore installations on the East Coast and the Gulf of Mexico. In addition, many cities along both coastlines were concerned about security. The Navy did not have any ships to spare for the task of security of the coast and directed the Revenue Cutter Service to perform the task. The cutters assigned to this task were a part of the "Flying Squadron" under the command of Navy Commodore Winfield Scott Schley. Dexter was assigned the area around Narragansett Bay, Rhode Island to patrol.

In 1904 Dexter was ordered to Puerto Rico. She returned to Newport in 1905.

On 11 December 1906 she struck and damaged the barge J. A. Hyland off Point Judith, Rhode Island when Dexter's engines became disabled.

Dexter was decommissioned at Arundel Cove, Maryland in 1908. She was sold on 18 July 1908 to Aiken Towing Company of Pensacola, Florida and renamed Leroy. She sprang a leak off Panama City, Florida and sank on 16 November 1926.
