= Bannec =

Island in Finistère, France

Native name: Banneg

- Location within France

Geography
- Location: Atlantic Ocean
- Coordinates: 48°25′40″N 5°00′45″W
- Area: 11 ha (27 acres)
- Length: 800 m (2600 ft)
- Width: 200 m (700 ft)

Administration
- France
- Region: Brittany
- Departement: Finistère
- Commune: Le Conquet

Demographics
- Population: 0 (2014)

Additional information
- Official website: http://www.molene.fr/Bannec.htm

Bannec or Banneck, Banneg in Breton (from the Breton bann, "horn", a term often used for sharp summits) is an uninhabited French island in the Iroise Sea close to the city of Brest in Brittany. It is situated at the northwestern end of the Molène archipelago, 4 km (2.5 miles) from the island of Ushant. This island is part of the Parc naturel régional d'Armorique and Parc naturel marin d'Iroise.

== Description ==
Located two kilometers northwest of the island of Balanec and four kilometers (2.5 miles) northwest of the island of Molène. Bannec has an area of eleven acres and is 800m long by 200m wide (2600 by 650 feet). The island is extended by Ledenez Banneg, an island connected to the main island of Bannec at low tide, but is separated from it at high tide. To the south, the island of Bannec is extended by two islands: Enez-Kreiz and Roc'h-Hir. The lighthouse Kéréon is on a nearby island called Men Tensel ("snarling stone"), in the Fromveur Passage between Bannec and Ushant. Rocky shores predominate, but the south-east coast is a low coast consists of sand and pebbles.

Populated by a large number of birds, Bannec is prohibited to all visitors, except to authorized personnel on scientific missions.

== History ==
=== 20th Century ===
In 1918, the islands Bannec and Balanec were well described by a traveler as follows:

Shortly after leaving Mullein, go round the islands Bannec and Balanec, covered with fog and covered with seaweed. These islands and look rather strange; one can see human silhouettes on the rocks bobbing in the thick cloud, seemingly full of formidable mysteries, with their long rakes they stir the ashes in their ovens in the open air. And if you can dream a little before this grand spectacle, no one knows if suddenly one is not carried many centuries back, and if one does not attend the celebration of the mysterious rites of banned cults.

— Robert Plé, À l'île de l'épouvante

==== Description of Bannec in 1930 ====
Pierre Bouis, who visited the islands in the archipelago of Mullein in August 1930, described Bannec in the journal Ouest-Éclair

Having chartered motorboat to the island Mullein, we will devote an afternoon to visit the Balanec and Bannec islands where lives, in unusual circumstances, pigouliers, burners seaweed. (...) In Balanec, we go to Bannec, another island to the north, where the burners seaweed are fewer. We observe the same customs and will hunt puffin, with black and white plumage, beak yellow and coral, or this small species of lazy gulls laying on the short grass, without further attention it lays eggs, or even the tern, who dig holes in rocks.

— Pierre Bouis, journal Ouest-Éclair n° 12341 of August 21, 1930

==== Description of Bannec in 1938 ====
André Salmon, in the journal Le Petit Parisien, describes Bannec in 1938:

At Bannek, along the course of the Fromveur, which separates Mullein, there is little that is living. It looks like a birthday cake petrified with all its candles. Popular imagination has curiously given names of human habitation to the rocks that rise all around the island, naturally high. Thus we find the Kastel ar Mouliged ("Castle Molénais"). In Bannek, humanity is revealed only by the Kéréon lighthouse, on the rock of 'Men-Tensel'. As more land is lost to the Ocean, the prosperous rabbits are galloping in troops less than one kilometer away. I must admit, people have tried camping on Bannek. It is not clear whether the campers were more discouraged by the incursions of rabbits or camping concern, to the depletion of drinking water and to need to bother with transporting it

==== After World War II ====
Until the World War II, like its neighbors, Bannec was inhabited by seaweed harvesters. One building remains, which was in ruins after the war, but was restored in 1979 as part of an observatory of the famous "blocs cyclopéens de Bannec" (Cyclops Rocks of Bannec).

Bannec was owned by the family of Huon Penanster before it was sold to the company NOEL, which was dissolved on 10 April 1964. Following a declaration of public utility, the island was purchased by the Department of Brittany in 1971. Bannec was incorporated into the Parc naturel régional d'Armorique on 30 September 1969 and the Finistere department entrusts management to the SEPNB, now known as Bretagne vivante (Brittany Alive) in October 1976.

== Media and the arts ==
Bannec was featured in some of the scenes of the 1929 film Finis Terræ.
