= USRC Dallas (1874) =

Ship of the U.S. Revenue Cutter Service

History

United States
- Name: USRC Dallas
- Namesake: Secretary of the Treasury Alexander J. Dallas (1759–1817)
- Builder: W. Fessenden, Portland, Maine
- Cost: $71,000 (USD)
- Commissioned: 28 July 1874
- Decommissioned: 30 November 1907
- Fate: Sold 2 July 1908

General characteristics
- Class & type: Dexter-class cutter
- Displacement: 179 tons
- Length: 140 ft 0 in (42.67 m)
- Beam: 21 ft 5 in (6.53 m)
- Draft: 10 ft 7 in (3.23 m)
- Installed power: 275 indicated horsepower (0.205 megawatts)
- Propulsion: Simple inverted direct-acting steam engine, 30-inch (762-millimeter) stroke; 720 pounds (327 kilograms) of coal per hour
- Sail plan: Schooner-rigged
- Speed: 9.5 knots at 70 revolutions (maximum)
- Complement: 40 (7 officers, 33 enlisted personnel)
- Armament: 2 guns

USRC Dallas, was a Dexter-class cutter of the United States Revenue Cutter Service in commission from 1874 to 1907. She was the fourth ship of the United States Revenue Cutter Service to bear the name.

Dallas was built by W. Fessenden at Portland, Maine, and was commissioned into the Revenue Cutter Service on 28 July 1874.

Dallas was stationed at Portland, which would remain her home port until 1903. She served on the New England coastline and conducted winter cruises each year. During the Spanish–American War of April–August 1898, she was ordered to "act in concert with Military authorities for defense of Boston Harbor" at Boston, Massachusetts.

Dallas was transferred to Lake Ontario in 1903. During her service on the Great Lakes, she was laid up during the winter months when the lakes iced over.

Dallas was decommissioned on 30 November 1907. She was sold on 2 July 1908 for $2,100 (USD).
