= Charles Edward Emery =

American civil engineer

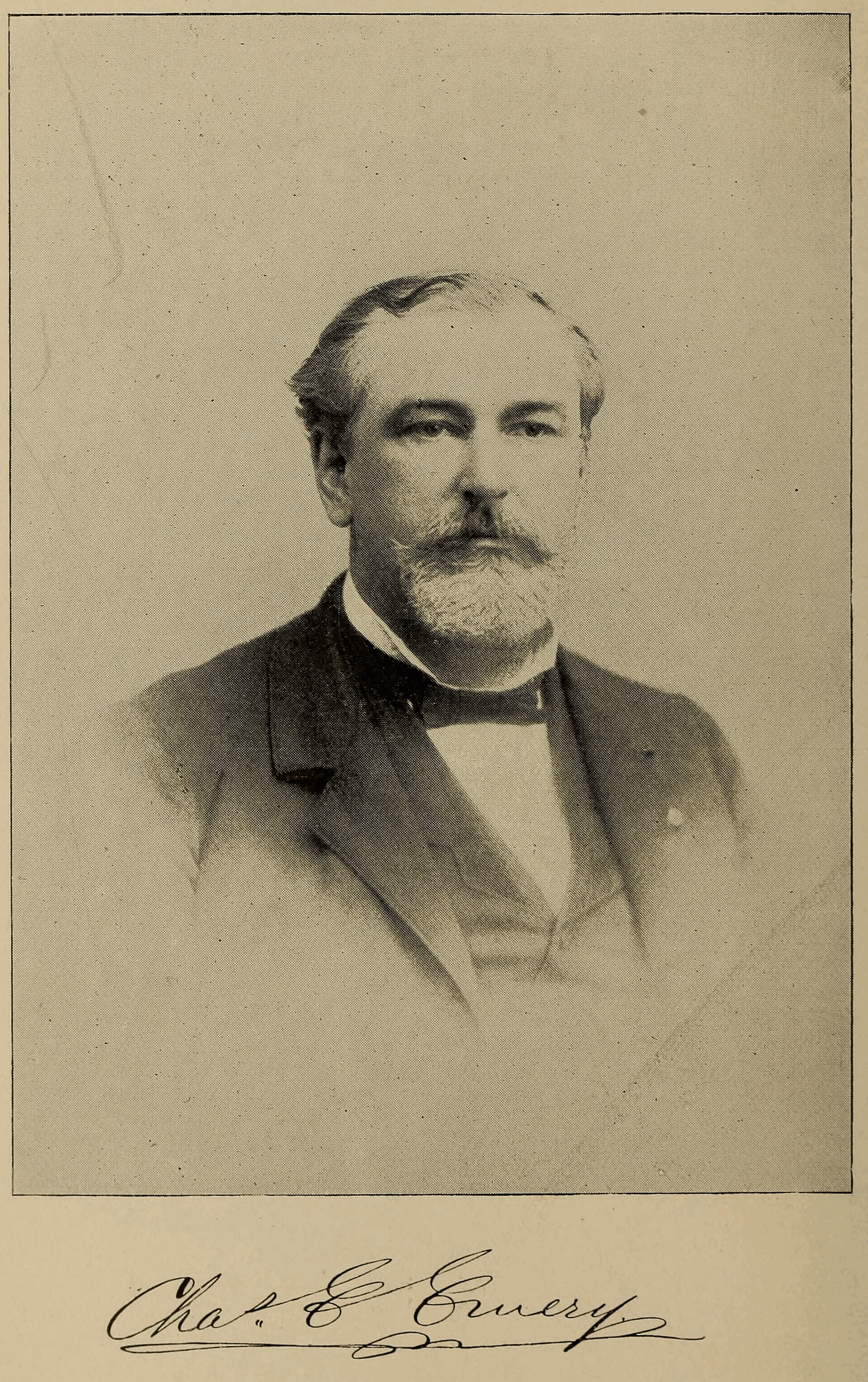
- Emery portrayed in an article in Cassier's Magazine in June 1893
- Born: March 29, 1838; Aurora, Cayuga County, New York, U.S.
- Died: June 1, 1898 (aged 60); New York City, U.S.
- Occupation: Civil engineer
- Parent(s): Moses Little Emery; Minerva Prentiss

Charles Edward Emery (March 29, 1838 – June 1, 1898) was an American civil engineer.

== Biography ==
Charles Edward Emery was born in Aurora, New York, on March 29, 1838, the son of Moses Little and Minerva (Prentiss) Emery, and a direct descendant of one of the original proprietors of the plantation of Contoocook, Massachusetts. He was educated at the academy in Canandaigua, New York, and early developed a taste for engineering. In July 1861, he entered the United States Navy as third assistant engineer, and served on the Richmond during engagements at Pensacola, Florida, the Mississippi River passes, and finally under David Farragut. In December 1862, he was promoted to second assistant engineer, and participated in the blockading of Charleston, South Carolina. In December 1867, he resigned, entered the employ of the Novelty Iron Works in New York City, and was general superintendent of the first American Institute Fair in its permanent quarters.

In 1869, he engaged in business for himself, but soon afterward became consulting engineer of the United States Coast Survey and the United States Revenue Marine, and had charge of the construction of the vessels of the former service until its engineering department was put in the hands of the navy. In connection with chief-engineer Charles H. Loring, he instituted a series of experiments to determine the relative value of compound and non-compound engines, and his results were published in scientific journals at home and abroad. In 1879, he was appointed engineer of the New York Steam Company, and the entire plant of that company was constructed from his designs, and was under his direction. The details were entirely new, as similar previous work had been on a small scale.

Emery divided New York City into ten heating districts, acquired land for central boiler plants, and began to lay the steam mains. Emery was considered one of the leading steam engineers of his day. For this unprecedented venture, his experience and ingenuity would be put to the test as he solved numerous technical challenges. Often he would consult with Thomas A. Edison when the two men happened to meet in the trenches, discussing the challenges of building their respective energy systems.

New York Steam's first central steam boiler plant, located at Cortlandt, Dey, Greenwich, and Washington Streets, was completed in 1881 and included 48 boilers and a 225-foot chimney — at the time, it was one of the tallest features of the lower New York skyline, second only to the spire of Trinity Church. The district steam installation was so novel it was the cover story of the November 19, 1881 issue of Scientific American.

During the 1930s, the New York Steam Company maintained mutually beneficial business arrangements that would be a portent of its eventual consolidation. The company supplied steam to the Consolidated Gas Company and its affiliated gas and electric companies in Manhattan. In turn, The New York Edison Company supplied steam from its Waterside and Fourteenth Street electric generating stations during the morning hours on cold days to help meet peak energy needs. In 1932, Consolidated Gas acquired approximately 75 percent of New York Steam's common stock, and on March 8, 1954, the New York Steam Company fully merged with Consolidated Edison.

Today, Con Edison operates the New York City steam system, the largest district steam system in the United States. The system contains 105 miles of mains and service pipes, providing steam for heating, hot water, and air conditioning to approximately 1,800 customers in Manhattan.

Emery made several inventions in connection with steam engines, and conducted experiments for the purpose of testing the practicability of lining steam cylinders with non-conducting materials. He was one of the non-resident professors of Cornell university, and his lectures were published in the Scientific American supplements. In 1879, he received the honorary degree of Ph.D. from the University of New York. He wrote technical papers, principally relating to steam engineering, most of which were contributed to the Transactions of the American Society of Civil Engineers, or those of the American Society of Mechanical Engineers, of which organizations he was a member.

He died in Brooklyn on June 1, 1898.
