= USRC Richard Rush (1874) =

Ship of the U.S. Revenue Cutter Service

History

United States
- Name: USRC Richard Rush
- Namesake: Secretary of the Treasury Richard Rush
- Operator: U.S. Revenue Cutter Service
- Builder: Atlantic Works Company, Boston, Massachusetts
- Cost: $79,800
- Launched: 14 March 1874
- Commissioned: 21 July 1874
- Decommissioned: Hull sold 31 August 1885; Machinery used to refit; USRC Rush built in 1885
- Homeport: San Francisco, California; Port Townsend, Washington
- Fate: Sold 1885, replaced by the USRC Rush (1885)

General characteristics
- Class & type: Dexter-class cutter
- Displacement: 179 tons
- Length: 140 ft (43 m)
- Beam: 23 ft (7.0 m)
- Draft: 8 ft 10 in (2.69 m)
- Installed power: Compound expansion steam engine, 400 hp (300 kW), single screw
- Sail plan: schooner
- Complement: 7 officers, 33 enlisted
- Armament: 2 × 6-pounders

USRC Richard Rush was a Dexter-class cutter of the United States Revenue Cutter Service which served in the coastal waters of the western United States and the Department of Alaska.

With a displacement of 179 tons, the vessel was 140 feet (43 m) long, 23 feet (7.0 m) in beam, and drew 8 feet 10 inches (2.69 m). Propulsion was provided by both a 400 hp (300 kW) steam engine driving a single propeller, and a schooner-rig of sail.

Rush was built by the Atlantic Iron Works in Boston, Massachusetts, launched 14 March 1874, and commissioned 21 July of that year. Fitting-out was completed in New York, and on 15 September the cutter sailed for San Francisco, arriving there 8 January 1875 after rounding Cape Horn. Among the plankowners was then First Lieutenant Michael A. Healy who at the time had never been on Alaska cruise but would later become an experienced captain of the Rush, Corwin, and Bear and become known throughout Alaskan waters as "Hell Roaring Mike" Healy. Healy assumed command of Rush in 1881 as a first lieutenant.

== History ==
=== Service ===
From 1877 through 1881 Rush completed four cruises in Alaskan waters. Thereafter the cutter was based in Port Townsend, Washington. In 1882 Rush was at San Francisco where the Royal Navy corvette HMS Comus took aboard the Marquis of Lorne, Governor General of Canada, and his spouse the Princess Louise, daughter of Queen Victoria, for their trip to Victoria, Canada. An anonymous note threatened the British ship with destruction when the couple boarded, but a search by the crew of Richard Rush yielded nothing, and Comus was escorted out to sea by the American cutter.

=== Retirement ===
On 31 August 1885 the cutter was decommissioned and the hull and other fittings sold. The machinery was used in the construction of USRC Rush, a larger cutter, completed on 10 November 1885.

== Notes ==
=== References cited ===
- "Rush, 1874" (asp). Cutters, Craft & U.S. Coast Guard-Manned Army & Navy Vessels. U.S. Coast Guard Historian's Office.
- "The Marquis of Lorne's Movements" (PDF). The New York Times. 20 August 1882.
- "The Marquis of Lorne Threatened" (PDF). The New York Times. 19 September 1882.
- Canney, Donald L. (1995). U.S. Coast Guard and Revenue Cutters, 1790–1935. Naval Institute Press, Annapolis, Maryland. ISBN 978-1-55750-101-1.
- Strobridge, Truman R. and Dennis L. Noble (1999). Alaska and the U.S. Revenue Cutter Service, 1867–1915. Naval Institute Press, Annapolis, Maryland. ISBN 978-1-55750-845-4.
