= SS City of Columbus =

American passenger steamer

Coordinates: 41°21′36″N 70°50′55″W

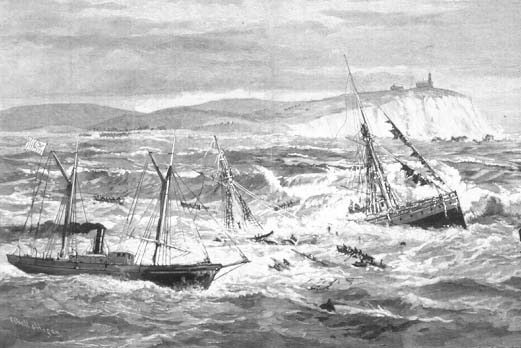
- City of Columbus and Revenue Cutter Dexter; Schell and Hogan, 1884

History
- Name: SS City of Columbus
- Owner: Boston & Savannah Steamship Co.
- Builder: Delaware River Iron Ship Building and Engine Works, Chester, Pennsylvania
- Launched: June 19, 1878 (148 years ago)
- Fate: Ran aground January 18, 1884, on Devil's Bridge off Martha's Vineyard

General characteristics
- Tonnage: 2250 gross register tonnage
- Tons burthen: 2,200 tons
- Length: 275 ft (84 m)
- Beam: 38 ft (12 m)
- Draft: 26 ft (7.9 m)
- Installed power: 1,500 hp (1,100 kW) compound steam engine
- Sail plan: Auxiliary sails on two masts, fore and aft
- Speed: 12.5 knots (14.4 mph; 23.2 km/h)
- Capacity: 200 passengers, 2500 tons cargo
- Crew: 45 officers and men (January 18, 1884)

City of Columbus was an American passenger steamer built in 1878 by Delaware River Iron Ship Building and Engine Works, at Chester, Pennsylvania. Owned by Boston & Savannah Steamship Company, the steamer made regular runs from Boston, Massachusetts, to Savannah, Georgia. City of Columbus ran aground on Devil's Bridge off the Gay Head Cliffs in Aquinnah, Massachusetts, in the early hours of January 18, 1884, resulting in 103 deaths.

== The shipwreck ==
On January 17, 1884, the steamer City of Columbus left Boston with a crew of 45 under the command of Captain Schuler E. Wright. Wright was very familiar with the area as he had made numerous trips through the reefs and sound of Martha's Vineyard. The captain left the City of Columbus's bridge in the hands of his Second Mate Edward Harding and went below to sleep. While off Martha's Vineyard at 3:45 am on January 18, the lookout yelled to the second mate that the Devil’s Bridge buoy was off the port bow rather than where it should have appeared off the starboard bow just before the ship struck a double ledge of submerged rocks. (Note: King cites 3:15 am as the time of the grounding) Harding ordered the Quartermaster, Roderick A. McDonald, to go port followed by Captain Wright's order to "hard port" and once again the City of Columbus smacked against the reef. Wright attempted in vain to free the ship. Attempts to use the sails only pushed the boat further into the reef. After these attempts, Wright decided to go over the “obstruction”. This just made things worse. The captain gathered the 87 passengers from below and was in the midst of explaining their situation when a rush of water into the cabin forced all to the top deck, where a giant wave struck the boat and swept all women and children, and many of the men, into the frozen waters.

Two lifeboats were launched from the City of Columbus only to have the ocean waves smash them against the iron sides of the ship. One actually made it to land with four survivors; the other was later found awash, with one survivor, a sea captain who was revived. Passengers and crew attempted to stay afloat in the rough seas by holding onto the rigging of the ship. Lighthouse keeper Horiatio N. Pease and a complement of Gay Head Wampanoag Native Americans, including Donald F. Malonson's grandfather, Thomas Manning, braved the waves in two lifeboats to save passengers that had held on. The sea was so rough that the Wampanoags feared approaching the steamer would cause their own boat to get smashed, so they called to the men to dive off the rigging and come to the lifeboats. Most of those who attempted this were saved by the Natives.

The rescue effort was then continued when the revenue cutter Dexter, skippered by Captain Eric Gabrielson, came to their aid. The Dexter, being a smaller ship, was able to move about the wreckage and pull survivors off the rigging and masts. Two of the survivors were unconscious; Second Lieutenant John U. Rhodes saved them by tying himself to a rope and swimming to the wreck. Even after being hit with a piece of wreckage, he continued, climbing the rigging to bring the men back to safety. The City of Columbus had left Boston with 45 officers and crew and 87 passengers, only 17 crew members and 12 passengers survived the ordeal. This incident was reported as one of the worst ocean disasters of its time.

The shipwreck was later purchased by the Boston Towboat Company in 1886, and some parts were salvaged.

== See also ==
- List of disasters in Massachusetts by death toll
