= Dexter (surname) =

Family name

Dexter is a surname that may be derived from the Old English word deagestre, Dexter is a Latin term meaning "skillful" or "right-handed".

Notable people with the surname include:

- Al Dexter (1905–1984), American country musician and songwriter
- Andrew Dexter Jr. (1779–1837), American financier and speculator
- Barrie Dexter (1921–2018), Australian former senior diplomat and public servant
- Brad Dexter (1917–2002), Serbian-American actor
- Brad Dexter (ice hockey) (born 1972), Canadian ice hockey defenceman
- Caroline Dexter (1819–1884), English-Australian writer and feminist
- Charles O. Dexter (1862–1943), American rhododendron hybridizer
- Colin Dexter, OBE (1930–2017), English crime writer
- Darrell Dexter (born 1957), Canadian politician
- Elliott Dexter (1870–1941), American film and stage actor
- Felix Dexter (1961–2013), British actor, comedian, and writer
- George E. Dexter (1823–1894), American politician in Wisconsin and Minnesota
- Gervon Dexter (born 2001), American football player
- Glen Dexter (born 1952), Canadian sailor
- Gregory Dexter, Baptist minister and colonial president of the colony of Rhode Island (Providence and Warwick only)
- Harry Dexter (1910–1973), English composer and arranger
- Henry Martyn Dexter (1821–1890), American clergyman and author
- Iris Dexter (1907–1974), Australian journalist and war correspondent
- James Dexter (born 1973), American football offensive tackle
- Jeff Dexter (born 1946), British disc jockey, club promoter, record producer and dancer
- Jerry Dexter (1935–2013), American voice actor
- Julie Dexter, British singer, songwriter and producer
- Kristen Dexter (born 1961), American politician from Wisconsin
- Mark Dexter (born 1973), English actor
- Maury Dexter (1927–2017), American producer and director
- Maxine Dexter (born 1972), American politician
- Michael Dexter (born 1945), British haematologist
- Nancy Dexter (1923–1983), Australian journalist
- Neil Dexter (born 1984), South African-born English cricketer
- Pete Dexter (born 1943), American novelist
- Sally Dexter (born 1960), English actress of stage and screen
- Samuel Dexter (1761–1816), American politician, U.S. Secretary of the Treasury
- Simon Newton Dexter (1785–1862), New York merchant and politician
- Steven Dexter (born 1962), South African theatre director and writer
- Ted Dexter (1935–2021), Sussex and English test cricketer
- Terry Dexter (born 1978), American contemporary R&B singer-songwriter, actress and multi-instrumentalist
- Timothy Dexter (1748–1806), American businessman noted for his writing and eccentricity
- Walter Dexter (disambiguation), multiple people

== See also ==
- Dexter (given name)
- Dex (disambiguation)
