= Dexter =

Dexter may refer to:

== Arts and entertainment ==
- Dexter (TV series), an American crime drama series that aired on Showtime.
  - Dexter Morgan, the protagonist of the series
  - "Dexter" (Dexter episode), the first episode of the series
- Dexter (film), a 2025 Indian Tamil-language film
- Dexter, title character in the cartoon series Dexter's Laboratory

== People ==
- Dexter (given name)
- Dexter (surname)
- Dexter (singer), Brazilian rapper Marcos Fernandes de Omena (born 1973)
- Dexter in the Newsagent, English singer-songwriter (born 2002)
- Famous Dex, also known as Dexter, American rapper Dexter Tiewon Gore Jr. (born 1993)

== Places ==
=== United States ===
- Dexter, Georgia, a town
- Dexter, Illinois, an unincorporated community
- Dexter, Indiana, an unincorporated community
- Dexter, Iowa, a city
- Dexter Township, Cowley County, Kansas
  - Dexter, Kansas, a city
- Dexter, Kentucky, an unincorporated community
- Dexter, Maine, a town
  - Dexter (CDP), Maine, a census-designated place
  - Dexter Regional Airport
- Dexter Township, Michigan
- Dexter, Michigan, a city located near, though distinct from, Dexter Township
- Dexter Township, Mower County, Minnesota
  - Dexter, Minnesota, a city
- Dexter, Missouri, a city
- Dexter, New Mexico, a town
- Dexter, New York, a village
  - Dexter Marsh
- Dexter City, Ohio, a village
- Dexter, Oregon, an unincorporated community in Lane County
- Dexter State Recreation Site, Lane County, Oregon, a state park
- Dexter Reservoir, also known as Dexter Lake, near Dexter, Oregon
- Dexter, Wisconsin, a town
- Dexter (community), Wisconsin, an unincorporated community in the town of Friendship

=== Canada ===
- Dexter, a community in Central Elgin, Ontario

== Schools ==
- Dexter High School (Michigan), Dexter, Michigan
- Dexter Regional High School, Dexter, Maine
- Dexter School, a private boys' school in Brookline, Massachusetts

== Science and technology ==
- dexter, an instance of psychometric software
- Dexter (malware), a computer virus
- Dexter (robot), a dynamically balancing bipedal humanoid robot research project by Anybots
- Dexter Award, presented by the American Chemical Society from 1956 until 2001
- Dexter National Fish Hatchery & Technology Center, Dexter, New Mexico, United States

== Ships ==
- USCGC Dexter, United States Coast Guard ships
- USRC Dexter, United States Revenue Cutter Service ships

== Structures ==
- Dexter Building, Chicago, Illinois, United States
- Dexter Cabin, Leadville, Colorado, United States
- Dexter House (disambiguation)

== Other uses ==
- Dexter, Latin for the direction "right"
  - Dexter, in dexter and sinister, a heraldic term referring to the right of the bearer of the arms (to the left for a viewer)
- Dexter cattle, a breed of cattle
- Dexter Air Taxi, a Russian air taxi service
- Tropical Storm Dexter (2025), the fourth named storm of the 2025 Atlantic hurricane season

== See also ==
- Dexterville (disambiguation)
- Dextral, a scientific term
- Dextre, a robot on the International Space Station
