= Dex =

Dex or DEX may refer to:

== People ==
- Barbara Dex, Belgian singer
- Dex Elmont, Dutch judoka
- Dex Lee, English actor
- Dex Manley, American actor
- Famous Dex, Chicago rapper
- Dex (entertainer) (Kim Jin-young, born 1995), South Korean YouTuber and actor

== Art, entertainment, and media ==
=== Fictional entities ===
- Ronon Dex, from the TV series Stargate Atlantis
- Dex Dexter, from the TV series Dynasty
- Dex, in the film Star Wars: Episode II – Attack of the Clones
- Dex, in the film The Tao of Steve
- Dex Dizznee, a character from Shannon Messenger's book series Keeper of the Lost Cities
- Prince Dex/Dex Steward, a character from Saban's Masked Rider
- Dex, a green villainous duck in the Malaysian animated series Chuck Chicken

=== Games ===
- Dex (video game)
- Dex, an abbreviation for the dexterity attribute in role playing games
- Battle Dex, an online, turn-based strategy game featuring collectible cards inspired by Advance Wars and Magic: The Gathering
- Pokédex, the collection of the fictional animals called "Pokémon"

=== Literature ===
- Dex, a fictional teen novel series Keeper of the Lost Cities by Shannon Messenger

=== Music ===
- Dex (software), a vocal from the Vocaloid software

=== Television ===
- Dex Hamilton: Alien Entomologist, an Australian children's TV program
- "Dex" (Dynasty), an episode of the TV series Dynasty

== Mathematics and science ==
- DEX (Graph database), a graph database
- dex (decimal exponent), for use with values on a logarithmic scale
  - Especially Metallicity § Chemical abundance ratios in astronomy
- Dexamethasone, a potent synthetic member of the glucocorticoid class of steroid hormones
- Dextroamphetamine, a psychostimulant drug
- Dexmedetomidine, a sedative medication frequently used in the ICU
- Dextromethorphan, an antitussive drug
- Dextrorotation, the property of clockwise-rotating plane polarized light
- Enantiomer or dextrorotary stereoisomer, in chemistry

== Brands and enterprises ==
- Dex Media
  - Dex One, subsidiary of Dex Media
- DEX New York, American cosmetics company
- Dex-Cool, antifreeze
- Subaru Dex

== Computing and technology ==
- DEX (protocol), a data-collection method for vending machines
- .dex, standard extension for a Dalvik Executable File, into which programs for the Android OS are compiled
- Decision EXpert, a qualitative multi-criteria decision analysis (MCDA) method
- Samsung DeX, a dock for smartphones, allowing desktop-like functionality
- Decentralized exchange (DEX), a cryptocurrency exchange without a central authority allowing peer-to-peer trading of cryptocurrencies

== Other uses ==
- Dicționarul explicativ al limbii române (DEX), The Explanatory Dictionary of the Romanian Language

== See also ==
- Dexter (disambiguation)
