= Dexter (given name) =

Male given name

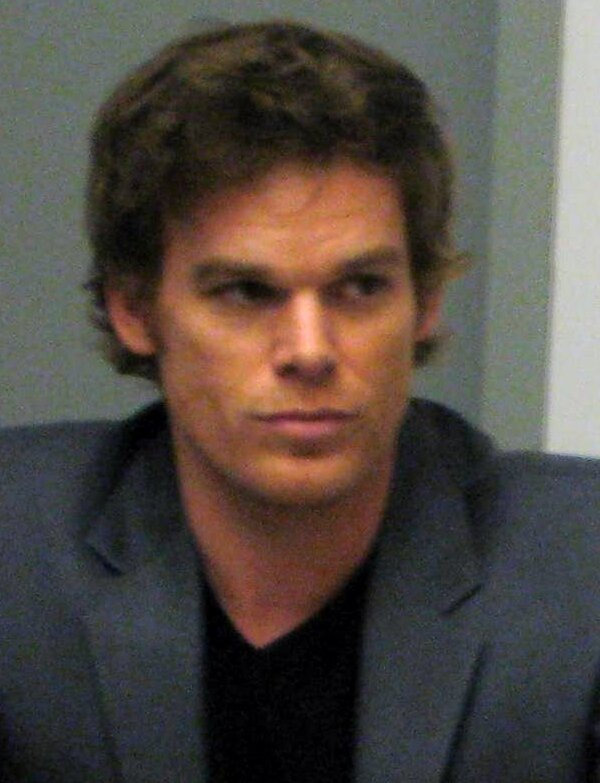
- Michael C. Hall portrayed Dexter Morgan in the American television drama series Dexter.
- Gender: Masculine
- Language: English

Origin
- Meaning: “Dyer of cloth”

Dexter is an English masculine given name. It is a transferred use of a surname derived from the Old English word deagestre, meaning "dyer of cloth." Dexter is also a Latin term meaning skillful. Usage of the name might have increased in the Anglosphere due to well-known figures such as American politician Samuel Dexter (1761–1816) and wealthy American eccentric and author Timothy Dexter (1747–1806). More recently, attention was called to the name in the 1940s and 1950s by different media influences, including the character Dexter Haven in the 1940 American film The Philadelphia Story and the 1956 American musical High Society and the character Dexter Franklin in the Meet Corliss Archer radio and television program. Some 325 more American boys were named Dexter in 1968 than had been given the name in 1967, likely due to news coverage about the family of Martin Luther King Jr. after he was assassinated. Dexter King (1961–2024) was one of King's sons. The name also increased in use in the United States in 1989 after the character Dex Dexter appeared on the American soap opera Dynasty and again between 2006 and 2012 due to the American television series Dexter.

== Given name ==
- Dexter Allen (born 1970), American blues musician
- Dexter Sol Ansell (born 2014), English child actor
- Dexter Bean (born 1987), American racing driver
- Dexter Blackstock (born 1986), English football player
- Dexter Brown (born 1942), British painter
- Dexter Canipe (born 1960), American racing driver
- Dexter Carter (born 1967), American football player and coach
- Dexter Coakley (born 1972), American football player
- Dexter Edgar Converse (1829–1899), American businessman and philanthropist
- Dexter Curtis (1828–1898), American inventor and politician
- Dexter Dalwood (born 1960), British painter
- Dexter Daniels (Aboriginal activist) (1938–c.1990), Aboriginal Australian activist
- Dexter Daniels (American football) (born 1973), American football player
- Dexter Darden (born 1991), American actor
- Dexter Davis (disambiguation), multiple people
- Dexter Doria, Filipino actress
- Dexter W. Draper (1881–1961), American football player and coach
- Dexter Dunphy (born 1934), Australian academic
- Dexter Edge (born 1953), American musicologist
- Dexter Faulk (born 1984), American track and field athlete
- Dexter M. Ferry (1833–1907), American businessman
- Dexter M. Ferry Jr. (1873–1959), American politician
- Dexter Filkins (born 1961), American war correspondent
- Dexter Fitton (born 1965), English cricketer
- Dexter Fletcher (born 1966), British actor
- Dexter Fowler (born 1986), American baseball player
- Dexter Goei (born 1971), American business executive
- Dexter Gordon (1923–1990), American jazz tenor saxophonist
- Dexter Grimsley (born 1970), American politician
- Dexter Gore Jr (born 1993), American rapper and songwriter
- Dexter Holland (born 1965), American punk rock singer and musician
- Dexter Hope (born 1993), Dutch basketball player
- Dexter Horton (1825–1904), American banker
- Dexter Jackson (disambiguation), multiple people
- Dexter Janke (born 1992), Canadian football player and coach
- Dexter Keezer (1895–1991), American economist and college administrator
- Dexter Kernich-Drew (born 1991), Australian basketball player
- Dexter King (born 1961), American civil rights activist
- Dexter Kozen (born 1951), American computer scientist
- Dexter Lawrence (born 1997), American football player
- Dexter Lumis (born 1984), WWE wrestling superstar
- Dexter Manley (born 1959), American football player
- Dexter McDougle (born 1991), American football player
- Dexter Miller, American politician
- Dexter Roberts (born 1991), American country music singer
- Dexter Simmons (born 1983), American fashion designer
- Dexter Tortoriello (born 1986), American singer-songwriter and record producer
- Dexter Vines, American comic book artist and inker
- Dexter Williams (born 1997), American football player
- Dexter Williams II (born 2002), American football player

== Fictional characters ==
- Dexter Mayhew, a character in the novel "One Day" by David Nichols turned into movie One Day (2011) and Netflix series One Day (2024)
- Dexter, also known as Dex-Starr, a member of the Red Lantern Corps in the DC Universe
- Dexter, the title character from Dexter's Laboratory
- Dexter, a monkey from the Night at the Museum film series, played by Crystal the Monkey
- Dexter, young version of the protagonist in the Space Ace video game
- Dexter "Dex" Barrington, a character in The Country Bears
- Ramone "Ray" Dexter, one half of the gunshark duo Sinister Dexter in the British comics anthology 2000 AD
- Dexter "Dex" Dizznee, a character from the novel series Keeper of the Lost Cities
- Dexter DeShawn, a character from the video game Cyberpunk 2077
- Dexter Douglas, the alter ego of the title character in Freakazoid!
- Dexter Hartman, a character from EastEnders
- Dexter Jettster, proprietor of Dex's Diner and criminal informant in Star Wars: Episode II – Attack of the Clones
- Dexter Morgan, a fictional serial killer/vigilante and blood spatter analyst created by writer Jeff Lindsay
- Dexter Mulholland, a character from EastEnders
- Dexter Riley, the title character of Dexter Riley film series
- Dexter Walker, a character in the Australian soap opera Home and Away
- Charles Dexter Ward, the protagonist of the cosmic horror novel The Case of Charles Dexter Ward by H. P. Lovecraft
- Dexter Vex, a character from the Skulduggery Pleasant series by Derek Landy
