= Dexterity (disambiguation) =

Dexterity refers to fine motor skills in using one's hands.

Dexterity may also refer to:

- Dexterity (programming language), used to customize Microsoft Dynamics GP software
- "Dexterity" (song), a 1947 bebop standard written by Charlie Parker
- Dexterity (Jo Jo Zep & The Falcons album), 1981
- Dexterity (George Shearing album), 1988
- Dexterity Island, Nunavut, Canada
- The dexterity attribute (ability score) of characters in various games, such as Dungeons and Dragons
- Dexterity (video game), a 1990 video game for the Nintendo Game Boy
- Manuel and Manuella Dexterity, siblings from the Xombi comics
- Operation Dexterity, a military operation

== See also ==
- Dextrous (disambiguation)
- Dextrose
