= USRC Dexter =

USRC Dexter was the name of more than one ship of the United States Revenue Cutter Service, and may refer to:

- USRC Dexter (1830), a cutter in commission from 1830 to 1841
- USRC Dexter (1874), a cutter in commission from 1874 to 1908

== See also ==
- USCGC Dexter
