= Dextrous =

Dextrous or dexterous is defined by Oxford Languages as showing or having skill, especially with the hands.

- Dexterity – fine motor skill
- When speaking of left- and right-handed people, the former can be known as "sinistrous", while the latter is "dextrous".
- See relative direction for the right-hand side

Dextrous can also mean:

- Dextrous or DJ Dextrous
- USS Dextrous

== See also ==
- Ambidexterity
- Dexter
- Dextre, also known as the Special Purpose Dexterous Manipulator (SPDM)
- Dextrose
