= Biana =

Biana could refer to:

- Bayana, a town in Rajasthan, India
- Biana Vacker, a character in the Keeper of the Lost Cities series of books
