= Sophie Foster =

Sophie Foster may refer to:

- Sophie Foster, a participant in the 2020 Winter Youth Olympics
- Sophie Foster, the protagonist of the fantasy series Keeper of the Lost Cities
- Sophie Foster, a character from the supernatural drama series Sleepy Hollow
