= Deuter (surname) =

Deuter is a surname. Notable people with the surname include:

- Florian Deuter (born 1965), German violinist and conductor
- James Deuter (1939–2010), American actor
- Martha Deuter, American politician

== See also ==
- Dexter (surname)
