= Gordon Hall (Dexter, Michigan) =

Historic house in Michigan, United States

- U.S. National Register of Historic Places
- Michigan State Historic Site
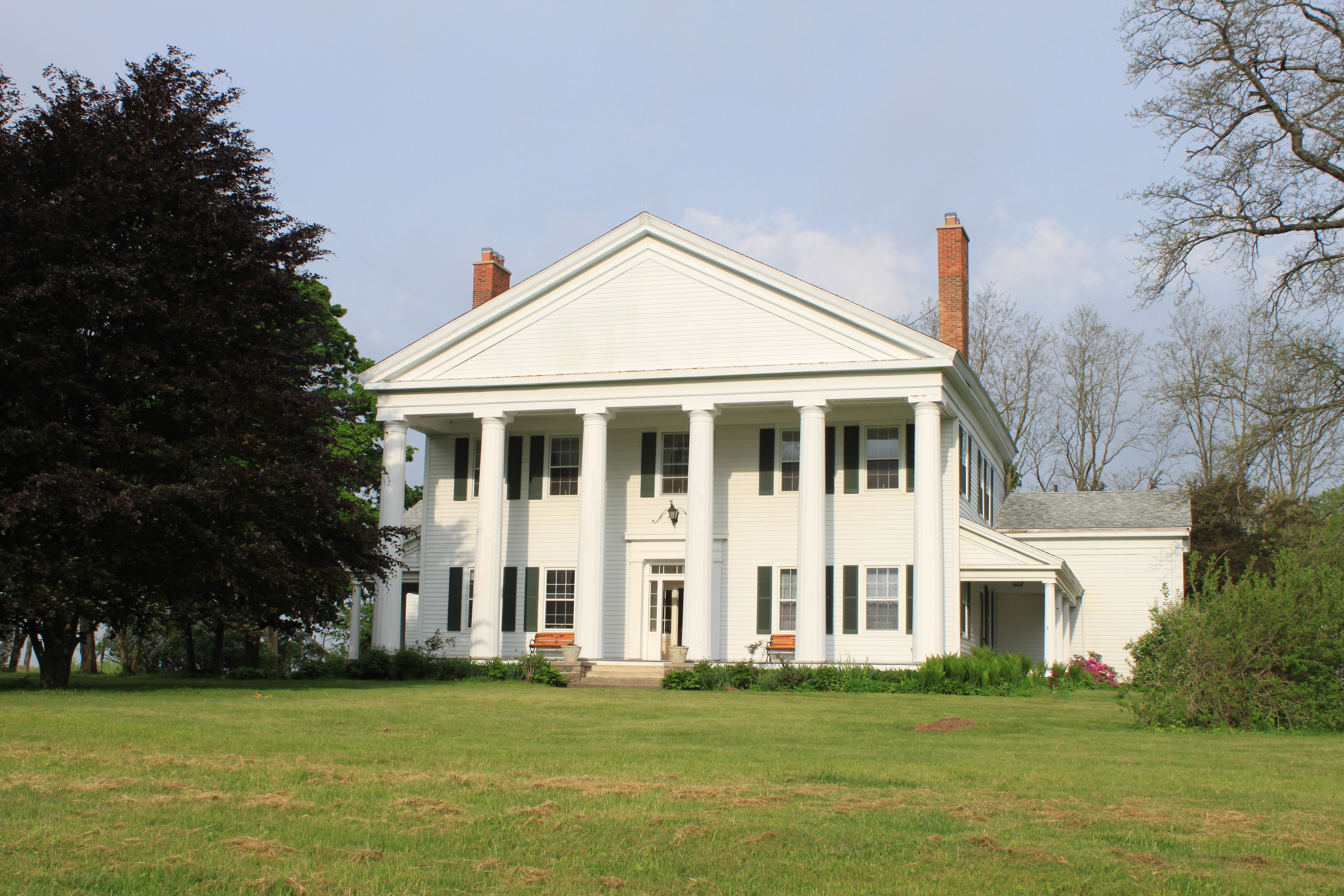

- Location within Michigan Location within the United States
- Interactive map
- Location: 8311 Island Lake Rd., Dexter, Michigan
- Coordinates: 42°20′25″N 83°53′55″W
- Area: 9 acres (3.6 ha)
- Built: 1844
- Built by: Sylvester Newkirk
- Architect: Calvin T. Fillmore
- Architectural style: Greek Revival
- NRHP reference No.: 72000664

Significant dates
- Added to NRHP: November 9, 1972
- Designated MSHS: February 19, 1958

Gordon Hall, also known as the Judge Samuel W. Dexter House, is a private house located at 8341 Island Lake Road in Dexter, Michigan. It was designated a Michigan State Historic Site in 1958 and listed on the National Register of Historic Places in 1972. The house is unique in Michigan for its balance, large scale, and massive hexastyle portico. The structure is also significant as the dwelling of Judge Samuel W. Dexter, a pioneering Michigan resident and land baron who had a substantial impact on early development of Washtenaw County and other sections of the state. The house was later owned by Dexter's granddaughter Katharine Dexter McCormick, a pioneering research scientist, suffragist, and philanthropist. In its early days, Gordon Hall hosted at least two, and possibly three United States presidents, and it was almost certainly a stop along the Underground Railroad.

== Samuel William Dexter ==
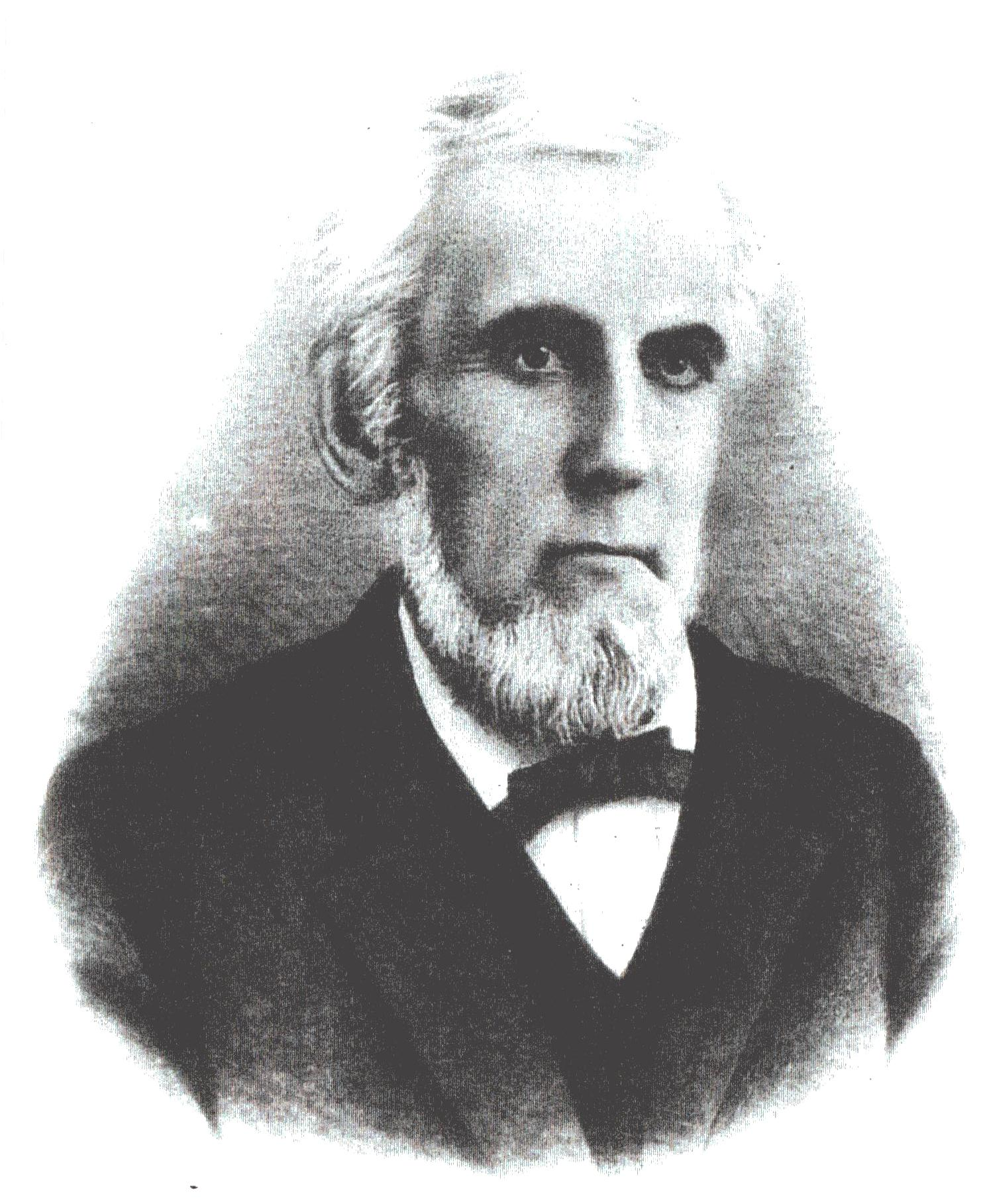
Judge Samuel W. Dexter, c. 1860

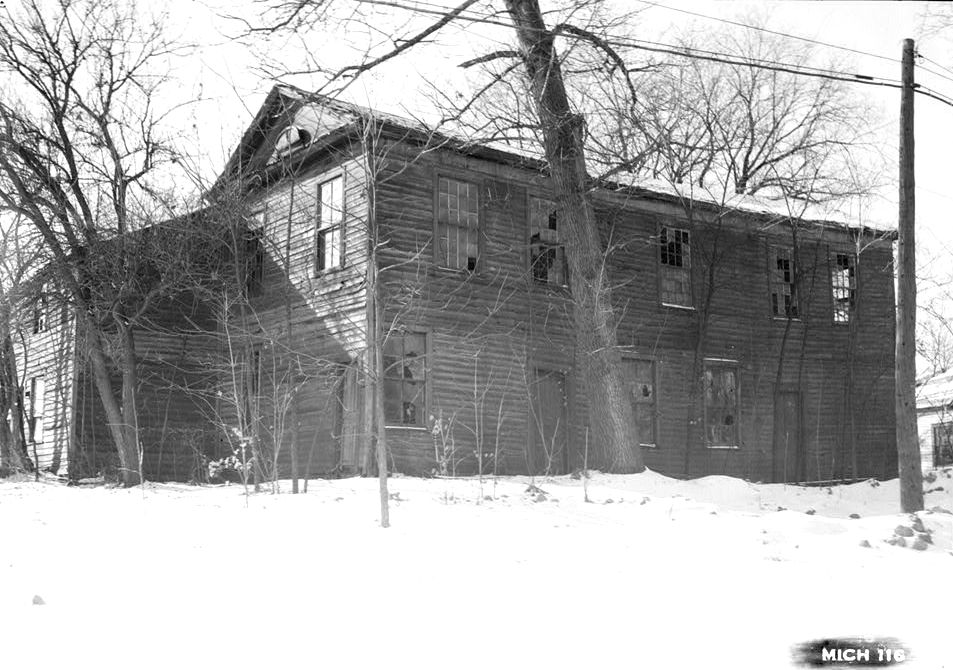
Samuel W. Dexter's earlier house on Huron Street in Dexter (demolished 1937)

Samuel W. Dexter was born in Boston in 1792 to Samuel Dexter, a politician who served as a Congressman, Senator, and both Secretary of War and Secretary of the Treasury under President John Adams; and Catherine Gordon, daughter of William and Temperance Gordon of Boston. The younger Dexter attended Harvard University, where he graduated in 1812, and he received a law degree three years later. He moved to Athens, New York, in 1816 and married Amelia Augusta Prevost. The couple had two children: Samuel P., born in 1817 (who died 1849), and Augustine, born in 1820. However, both Amelia and Augustine died in 1822.

In 1824, Dexter moved to Detroit with $80,000, and proceeded to purchase 926 acres of land in Michigan. On that land, Dexter founded Byron, Michigan, the county seat of Shiawassee County, and Saginaw, Michigan, the county seat of Saginaw County. He also purchased land in Webster and Scio Townships in Washtenaw County, on which he later founded the village of Dexter. On his Washtenaw County holdings, Dexter built a sawmill on Mill Creek, and a log cabin nearby. Dexter returned to Massachusetts in 1825, and there married his second wife, Susan Dunham. Dexter returned to Michigan in 1826, living in the log cabin while a frame house was built nearby on the riverbank, located on what is now Huron Street in the present-day village of Dexter.

As the village grew, Dexter's house became the center of activity for the community. Dexter established a post office in the house, and it was used as a place of worship for a number of different denominations. In 1826, Dexter was appointed Chief Justice of Washtenaw County by Lewis Cass, a post he served in until 1833. In addition to his sawmill, he also built a grist mill and a boarding house. In 1829, he established the first newspaper in Washtenaw County, the Western Immigrant, published in Ann Arbor. He also ran for Congress in 1831, and served as a Regent of the University of Michigan in 1840.

In 1827, a son was born to Dexter and his wife Susan; however, soon after both Susan Dexter and the infant died. In 1828, Dexter married his third wife, sixteen-year-old Millisent Bond, whose widowed mother had recently settled in Michigan after moving from Massachusetts. The couple had eight children: Mary (born 1830), W. Wirt (born 1831), Katherine (born 1833), Hannah (born 1834), Julia (born 1837), Charlotte (born 1839), Isabella (born 1841) and Marshall (born 1858 – died 1880). All of the children lived to adulthood.

In 1830, Dexter platted a village on the land surrounding his house; he named it "Dexter" to honor his father. He also obtained land in other parts of Michigan; in addition to establishing Saginaw, Byron, and Dexter, he platted Ionia, Michigan, and by 1835 owned 3,500 acres (1,400 ha) of land in Washtenaw County alone. Dexter was a vocal supporter of railroads (and, indeed, is generally credited as the first person to publicly call for the construction of a transcontinental railroad, in an editorial in 1832), and in 1837 deeded a 100-foot (30 m) wide portion of his land to the state for the purpose of constructing a railroad.

The railroad was built in 1841, and passed very close to Dexter's Huron Street house. This encouraged him to build a larger country mansion on 1,700 acres (690 ha) outside of Dexter, a house he called "Gordon Hall" in honor of his mother, Catherine Gordon Dexter.

== Gordon Hall history ==
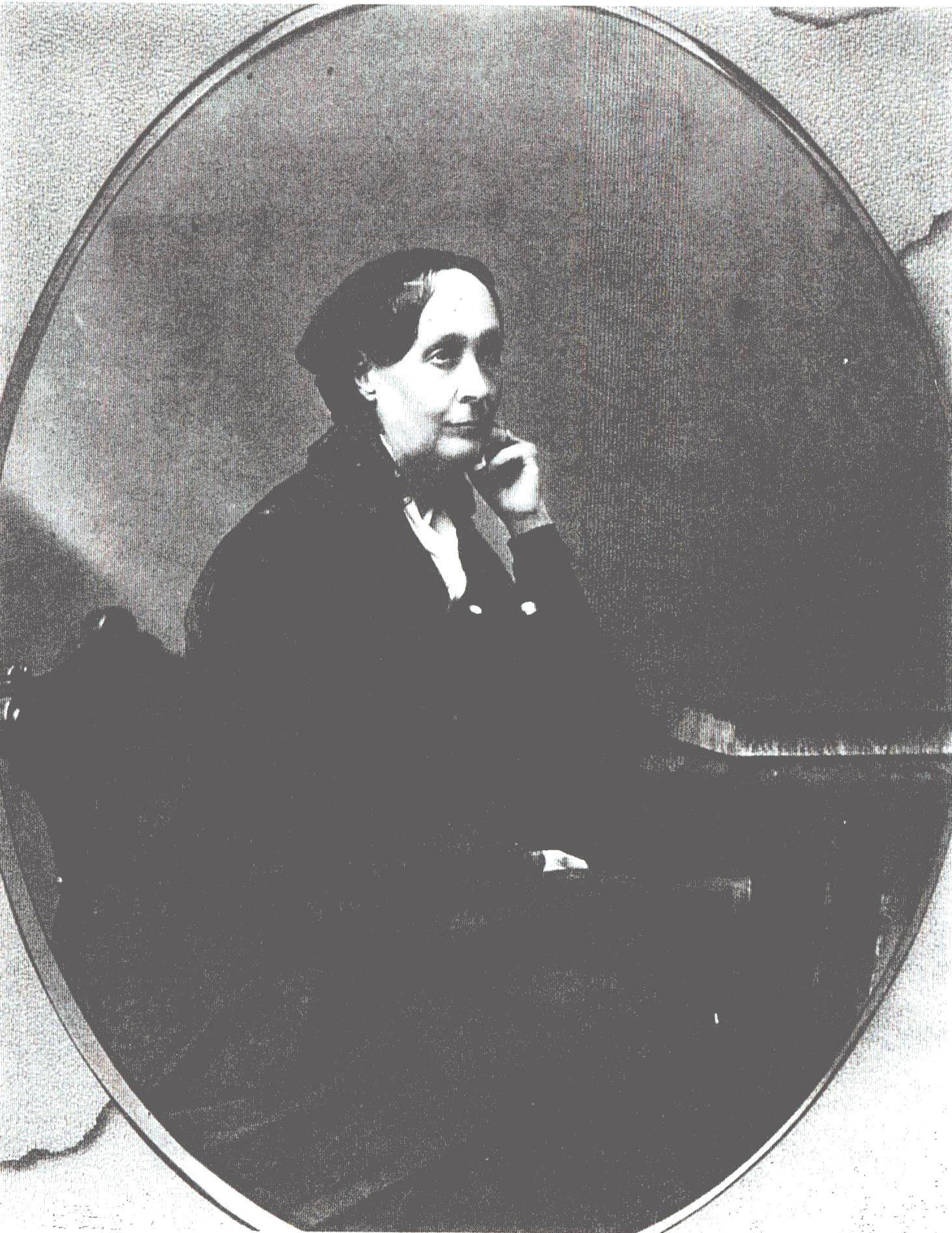
Millisent Dexter c. 1870

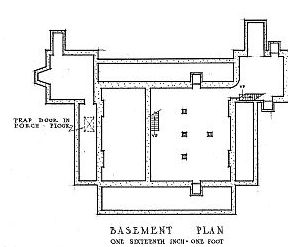
Basement plan: note trap door callout on left

Dexter chose a site on a prominent hilltop to build his country estate. He hired architect Calvin T. Fillmore (brother of Millard Fillmore) to design his new country house. Fillmore had moved to Washtenaw County in 1837, and had a successful career as an architect and builder. Dexter himself also had some hand in the design. Overseeing the building was Fillmore's assistant Sylvester Newkirk, who later went on to become a successful contractor, and also to marry Fillmore's niece Viola Johnson. Construction on Gordon Hall began in 1841, and wasn't completed until 1843. The substantial construction time was due in great part to the difficulty in obtaining lumber, much of which had to be hauled in from Flint or Detroit. However, once construction was complete, the Dexters moved from their previous house on Huron Street into the new country house (the Huron Street house was demolished in 1937).

The Dexters, as prominent citizens, entertained many important visitors, including US Presidents James K. Polk and James Buchanan. Although it is not certain, it is likely that a third president, Millard Fillmore, also visited Gordon Hall – it is known that Fillmore visited his brother Calvin, and it is likely the pair would have toured the house that Calvin designed.

Samuel Dexter was a staunch abolitionist, and it is nearly certain that Gordon Hall was a stop on the Underground Railroad. There is some evidence that Millisent Dexter employed a string of Black servants, all of whom were recent arrivals to the village and none of whom stayed for any length of time. In oral histories, Samuel Dexter and his sons were identified as conductors on the Underground Railroad. More telling, it has been documented that Gordon Hall once contained a secret room in the basement, accessible through a trap door on the south porch and from concealed openings in crawl spaces under the other porches. Although the trap door was removed during remodeling and the "secret" room had doors cut to it, the passages to the crawl space remain in the house.

Samuel Dexter lived in Gordon Hall until he died on January 6, 1863. Millisent Dexter and some of their children continued to live in the house. Millisent made some alterations to the structure, most significantly removing one of the wings and adding a four-story tower in its place in the 1870s. Samuel Dexter's business operations were passed to Wirt Dexter, his only son. Wirt sold off much of the surrounding land, so that by 1875 the estate was down to about 70 acres. On June 27, 1899, Millisent Dexter died. Her will specified that Gordon Hall was to be sold, with the proceeds of the sale being split among her daughters. In 1900, the house was sold to Thomas Birkett, a prominent local banker and miller.

Birkett lived in the house for some time, but at some point moved out, leaving it vacant. By the time of his death in 1916, the structure was in very poor condition. After Birkett's death, the property was purchased by Dr. Charles G. Crumrine, a physician from Detroit whose health was failing and who wished to retire to the country. Crumrine moved into Gordon Hall in 1919, repairing the structure and adding a new roof. He ran the property for some time as a farm, but was soon overcome by illness and died in 1924. Crumrine willed the property to his son, Charles Jr. The younger Crumrine rented out portions of the house, but then allowed it to go vacant for many years, and again fall into disrepair. In 1934, the Historic American Buildings Survey project documented the building, taking photographs and making drawings of the exterior.

In 1939, Katharine Dexter McCormick purchased the property. McCormick was the daughter of Judge Samuel Dexter's son Wirt, and had been born in Gordon Hall in 1875. She had graduated from the Massachusetts Institute of Technology in 1904 with a BS in biology. She then married Stanley McCormick, the son of Cyrus McCormick. Katharine McCormick conducted research in biochemistry and schizophrenia, was instrumental in achieving the ratification of the 19th amendment allowing women to vote, and co-founded the League of Women Voters. At the time she purchased Gordon Hall, McCormick was living in California. She hired Emil Lorch, dean emeritus of the College of Architecture at the University of Michigan, to restore the house, thinking to turn it into a place that could be used by Dexter's women's clubs.

Lorch spent eight years restoring and refurbishing the building, including the removal of the four-story tower built by Millisent Dexter and rebuilding the wing similar to the original. However, in 1950, before the rehabilitation was complete, McCormick gave the property to the University of Michigan, in part to help settle some of her own estate tax issues. By some reports, the gift contained the stipulation that the interior be converted to apartments for university faculty and staff. By other reports, the conversion was the university's idea and no one had informed McCormick. In any case, despite the controversial timing, contractors were swiftly employed, the interior was completely gutted, and the conversion was completed. One of the first occupants was Alexander Grant Ruthven, who moved into Gordon Hall after stepping down from the presidency of the university in 1951.

The university continued to maintain the property until 2000, when it decided to sell it. In 2006, the Dexter Area Historical Society and Museum purchased the property, with the intent of making it a community resource. A small parcel of the grounds was sold in 2009, to United Methodist Retirement Community, Inc., who built a senior citizens' retirement community on the site; the sale reduced the size of the grounds to about 68 acres. As of 2011, the building was unoccupied, but was used occasionally for tours and functions.

== Description ==
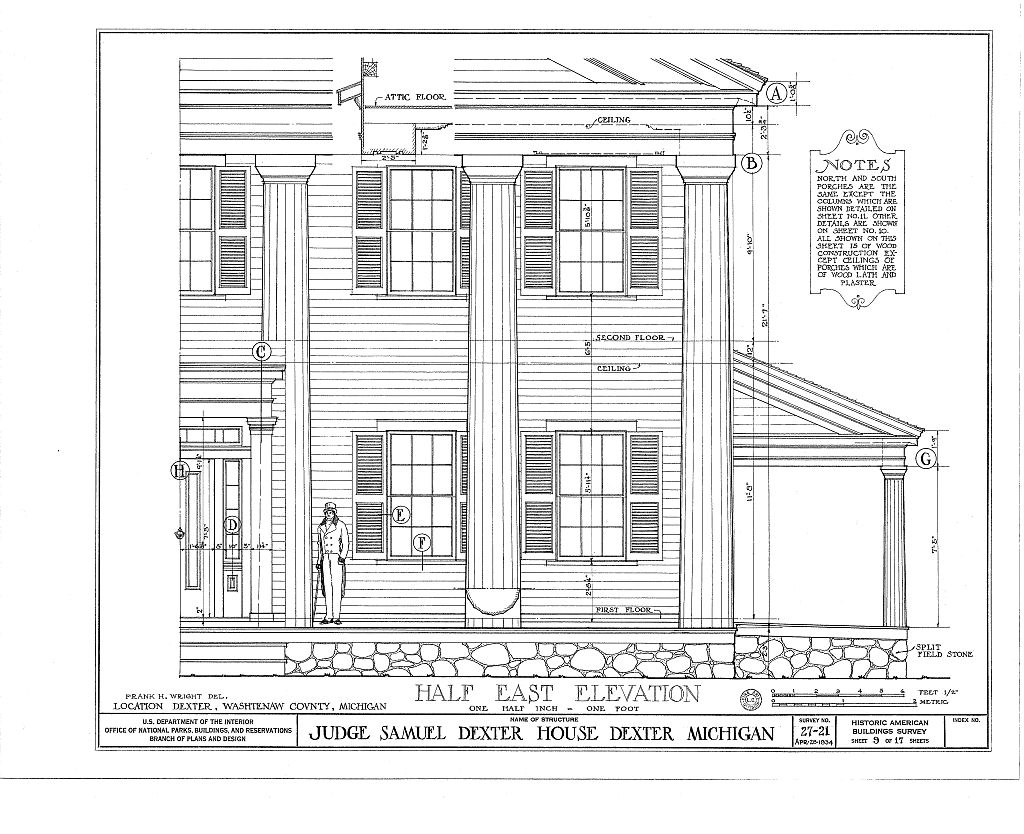
Front half-elevation

The Judge Samuel W. Dexter House is a two-story rectangular Greek Revival post-and-beam frame structure, sitting on a stone and concrete foundation. The design is a classic "hen and chicks" configuration, with the main two-story structure, measuring 50 feet (15 m) by 38 feet (12 m), flanked by a pair of 1 1/2-story wings, measuring 18.5 feet (5.6 m) by 18.5 feet (5.6 m), connected on the rear corners. The exterior is clad in aluminum siding installed during the 1951 renovation, although the original clapboard siding is still underneath.

The front facade features a gabled temple front, with an impressive hexastyle Doric portico along the front facade that extends the full height of the building. The main door is centered in the front portico, and is surrounded by sidelights and pilasters and topped with a transom. The front is five bays wide, with symmetrical window placement.

The side elevations of the house have small single-story porches, supported by three Doric columns. A fourth porch spans the rear of the house, connecting the additions, with a rear door similar in detail to the front opening onto the porch. Two more doors access the side porches. A set of three doors opens onto the deck formed by the roof of the rear porch. The windows in the house are double-hung, with six-over-six lights, many of which are original to the house. The roof is covered with asphalt shingling, and a set of low-sloped dormers project to the rear.

There is approximately 2,500 square feet on each of the first and second floors, and somewhat less in the unfinished attic and basement. The original interior configuration had a grand central hall and stairwell, with four large rooms at each corner, all with fireplaces. On the first floor these were identified as a dining room, a parlor (or library), and two drawing rooms. On the second floor, these were four bed chambers; an additional sewing room spanned the area across the front of the house. Additional rooms, including a first-floor kitchen, were in the side wings. In all, the original house had 22 rooms, nine fireplaces, and 55 windows. The ceilings rise 12 feet (3.7 m) on the first floor and 10 feet (3.0 m) on the second.

However, the 1951 renovation nearly eliminated the historical integrity of the interior of the structure, with all interior trim and nearly all the walls removed. The house was converted into four apartments, with two stairways for accessing the second-floor apartments and the attic space. All four apartments are nearly identical, with two bedrooms, a small bathroom, a kitchen, and a combined living room/dining area.

Although the interior has lost its historic fabric, the main structure is substantially intact, and the large-scale majestic features that make the structure architecturally significant still exist. Gordon Hall has often been likened to Jefferson's Monticello, in part due to its grand execution and in part due to its situation on a hilltop and the surrounding, and still extant, sweeping view.

== Gallery ==
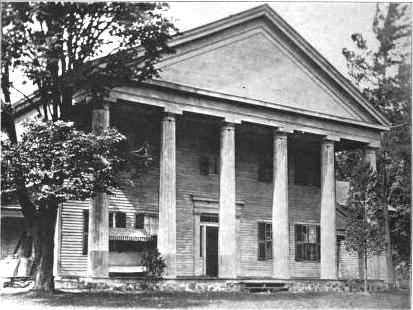
Front facade, c. 1922

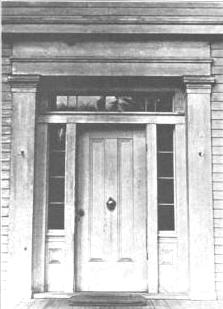
Front door, c. 1922

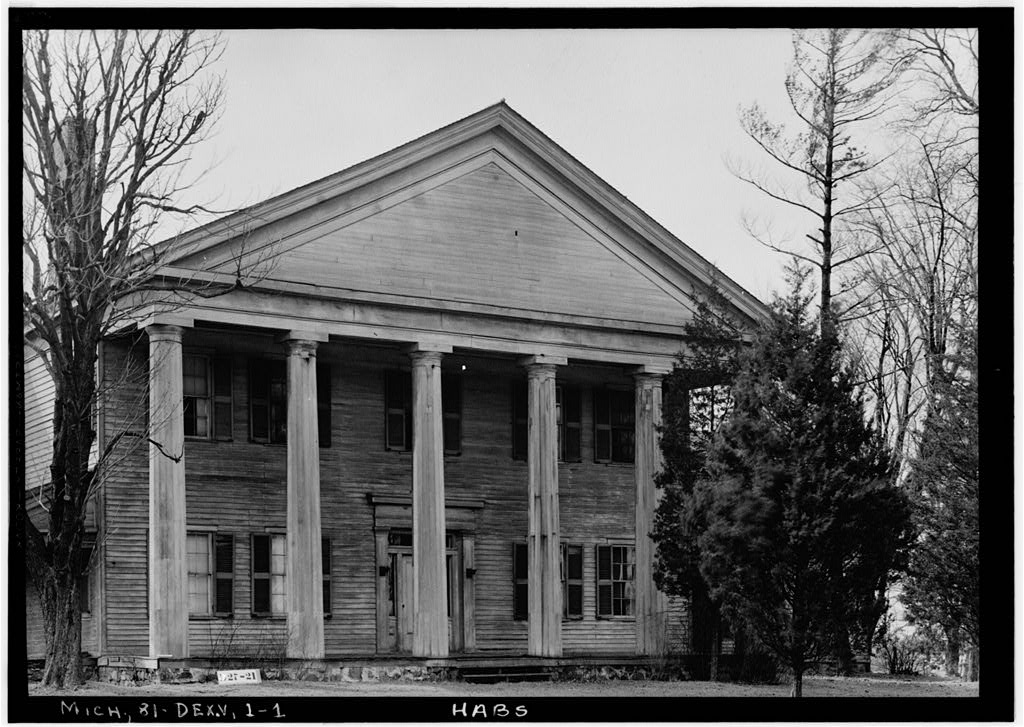
East (front) facade, 1934

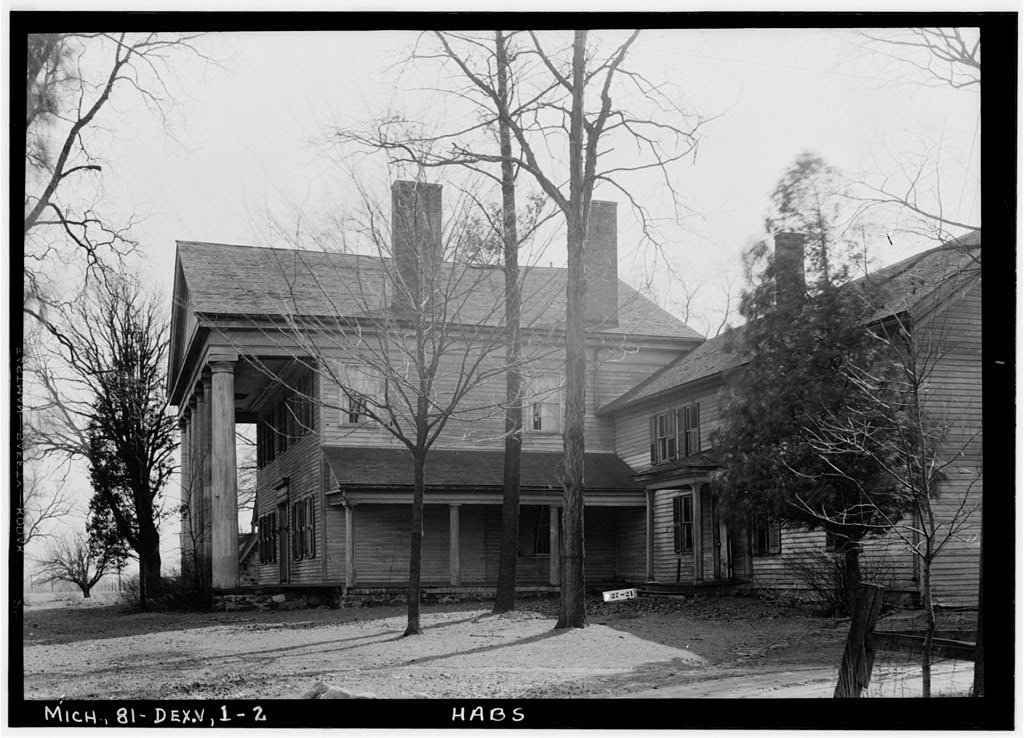
North facade, 1934

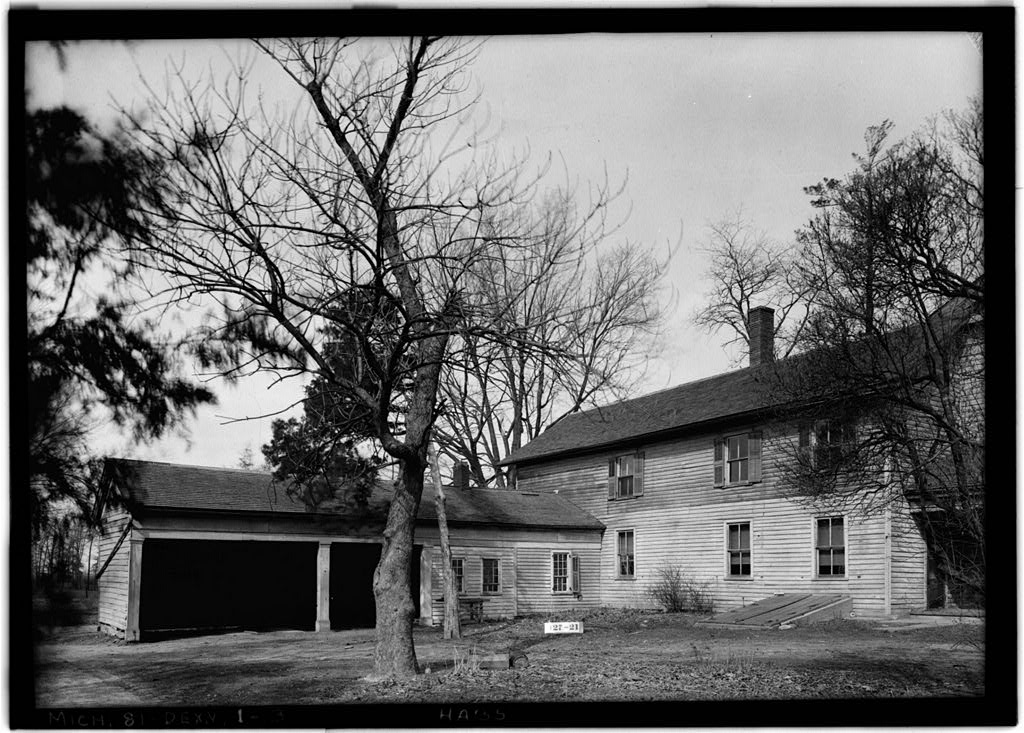
South facade, 1934

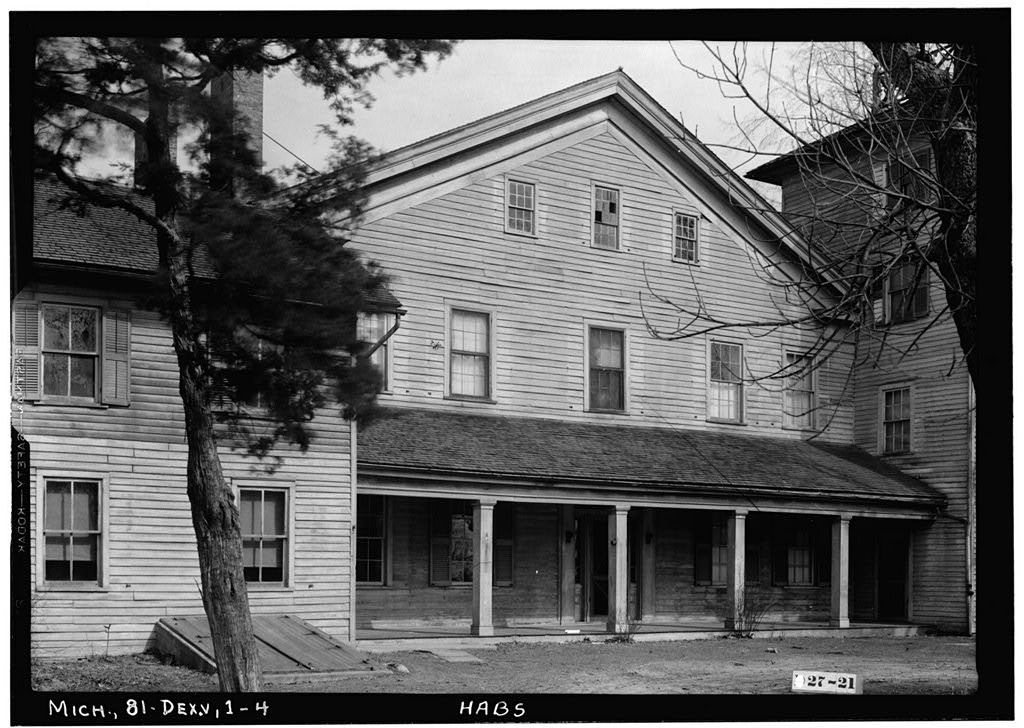
West facade, 1934

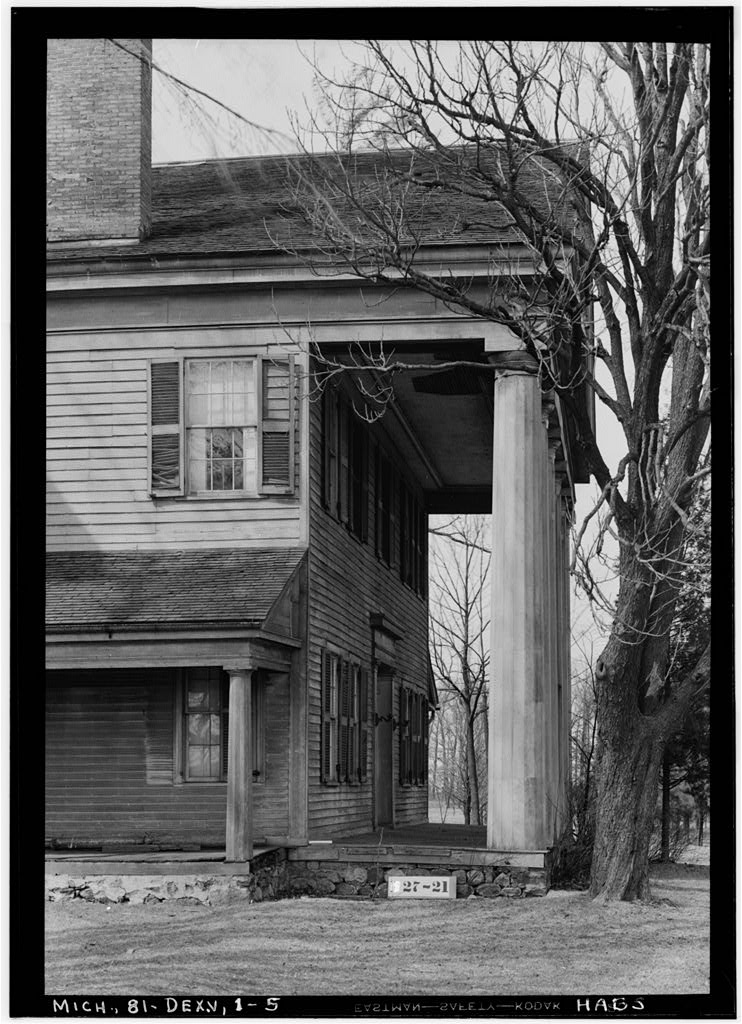
Portico, 1934

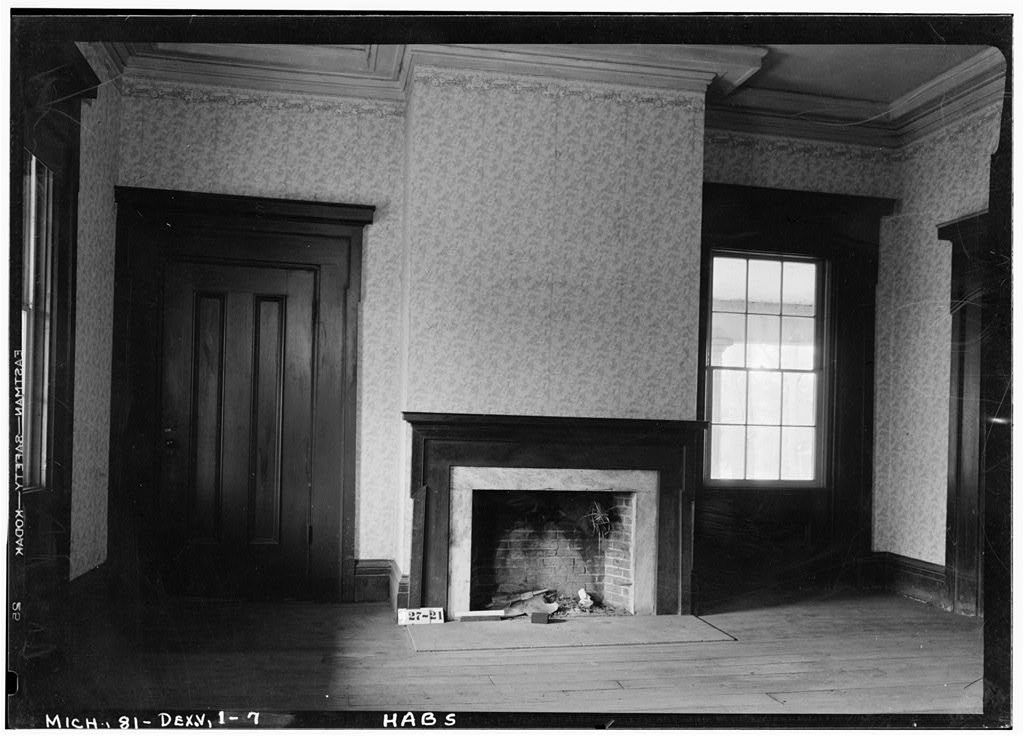
Dining room, 1934

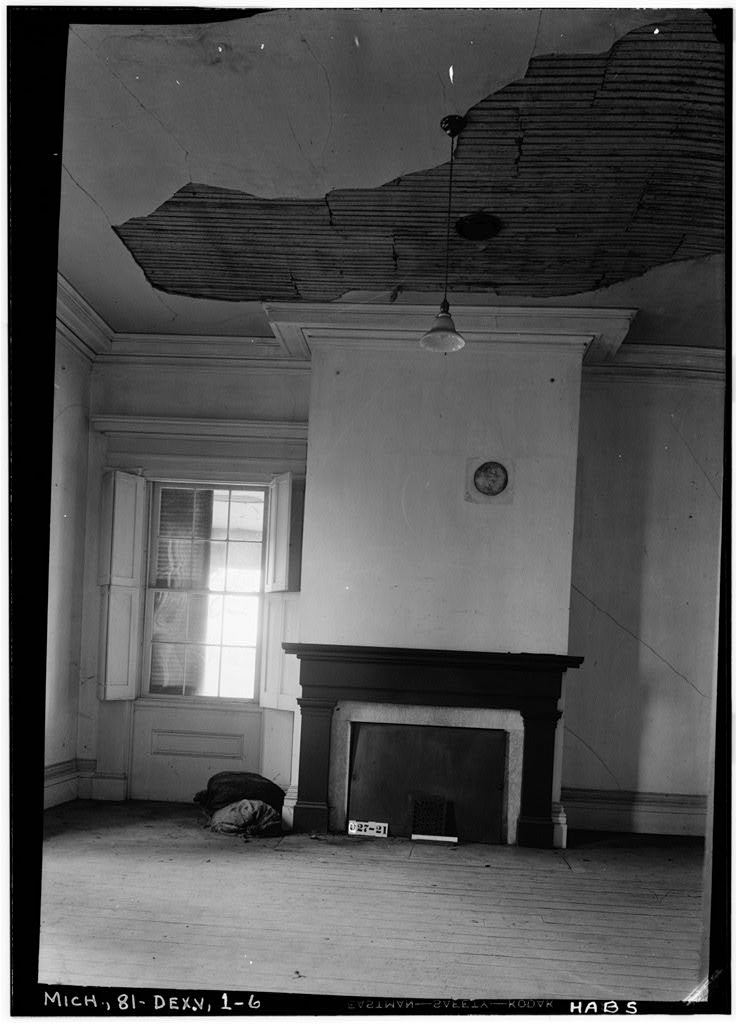
Drawing room, 1934

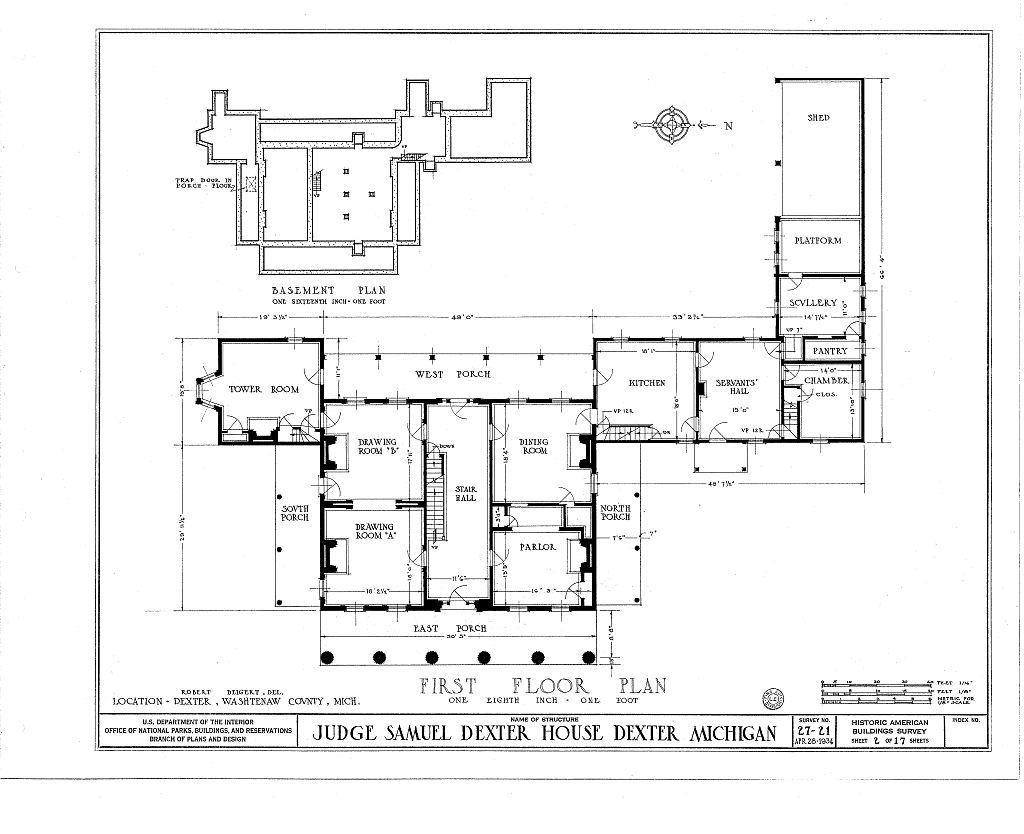
First floor plan

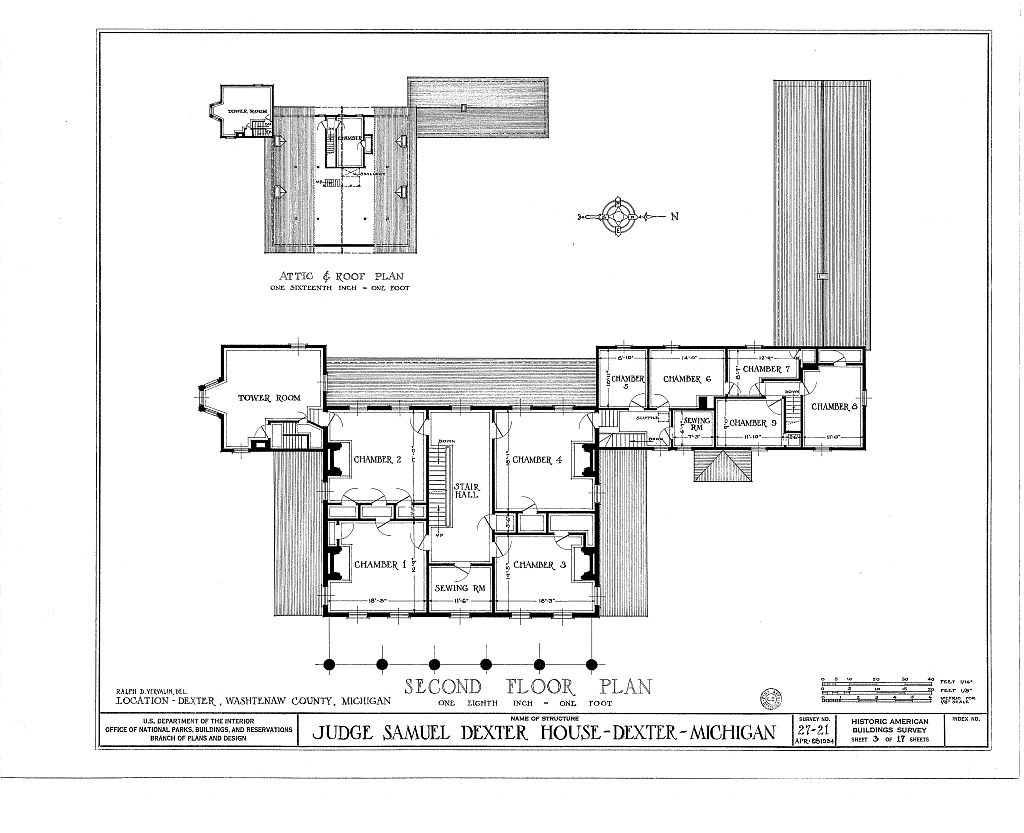
Second floor plan

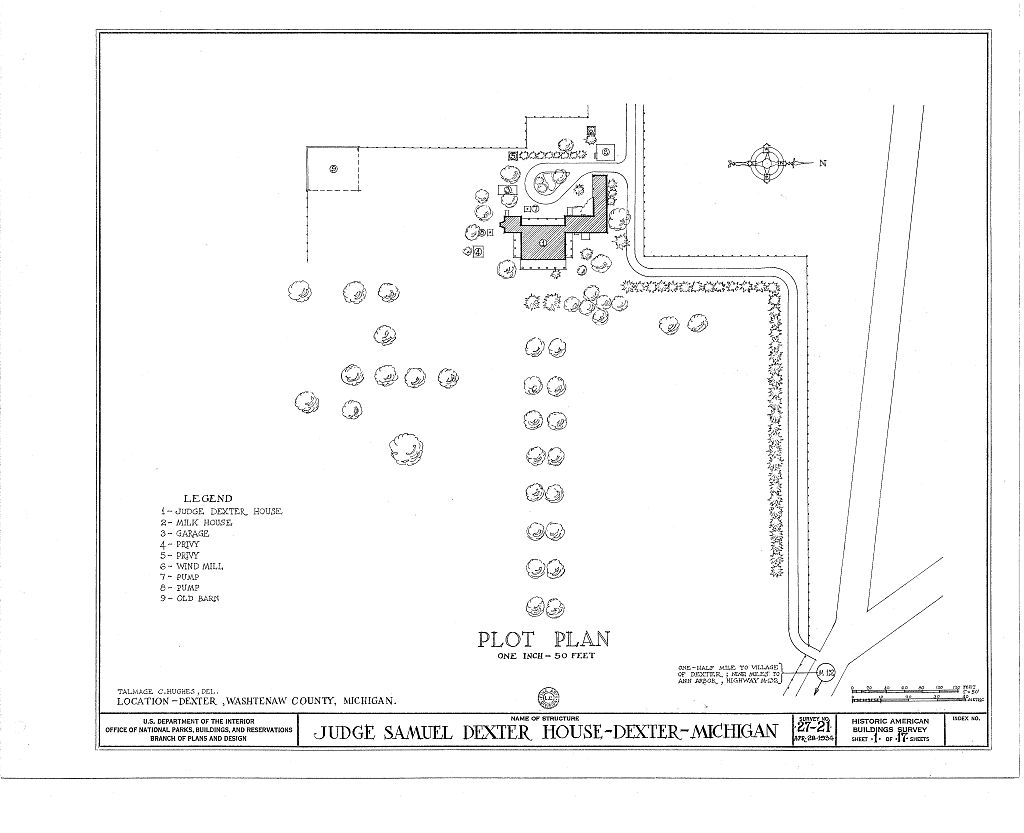
Plot plan
