= DEX New York =

DEX New York Cosmetics, Inc.
- Company type: Incorporated
- Industry: Personal care
- Founded: March 2008
- Founder: Dexter Phillip (CEO) and Daniel Padnos (CFO)
- Headquarters: New York City, United States
- Number of locations: 19 (1 showroom, 18 retail partners)
- Area served: North America
- Products: Cosmetics
- Website: www.dexnewyork.com

DEX New York Cosmetics, Inc. is an American cosmetics company that specializes in mineral make-up without the use of mica or bismuth oxychloride as its base. Its product line includes DEX New York Cosmetics, as well as like-branded make-up applicators and accessories. Its corporate headquarters is located in New York - the cross roads of Fifth Avenue and East 57th Street.

== History ==
Trinidad-born Dexter Phillip, a fashion consultant by trade, founded DEX New York in March 2008 together with partner Daniel Padnos. It consists of his mineral cosmetics line and a private beauty-and-photography studio in 65th Street in downtown Manhattan. The company moved its studio to a 750-square-foot space in Fifth Avenue in 2010, with Lady Gaga as their first client. The new studio is meant to be exclusive, as it can only accommodate two clients at a time and does not have a street-side window to ward off paparazzi. Meanwhile, DEX New York Cosmetics has expanded into over 120 products, including mineral-based skin products, powders, eye shadows, lipsticks, and sunless tanner.
