= Dexterville =

Dexterville may refer to:

== Places ==
United States

- Dexterville, Kentucky
- Dexterville, New York
- Dexterville, Wisconsin

== See also ==
- Dexter (disambiguation)
- Petronilla Deterville
