= James McHenry =

American Founding Father and surgeon (1753–1816)

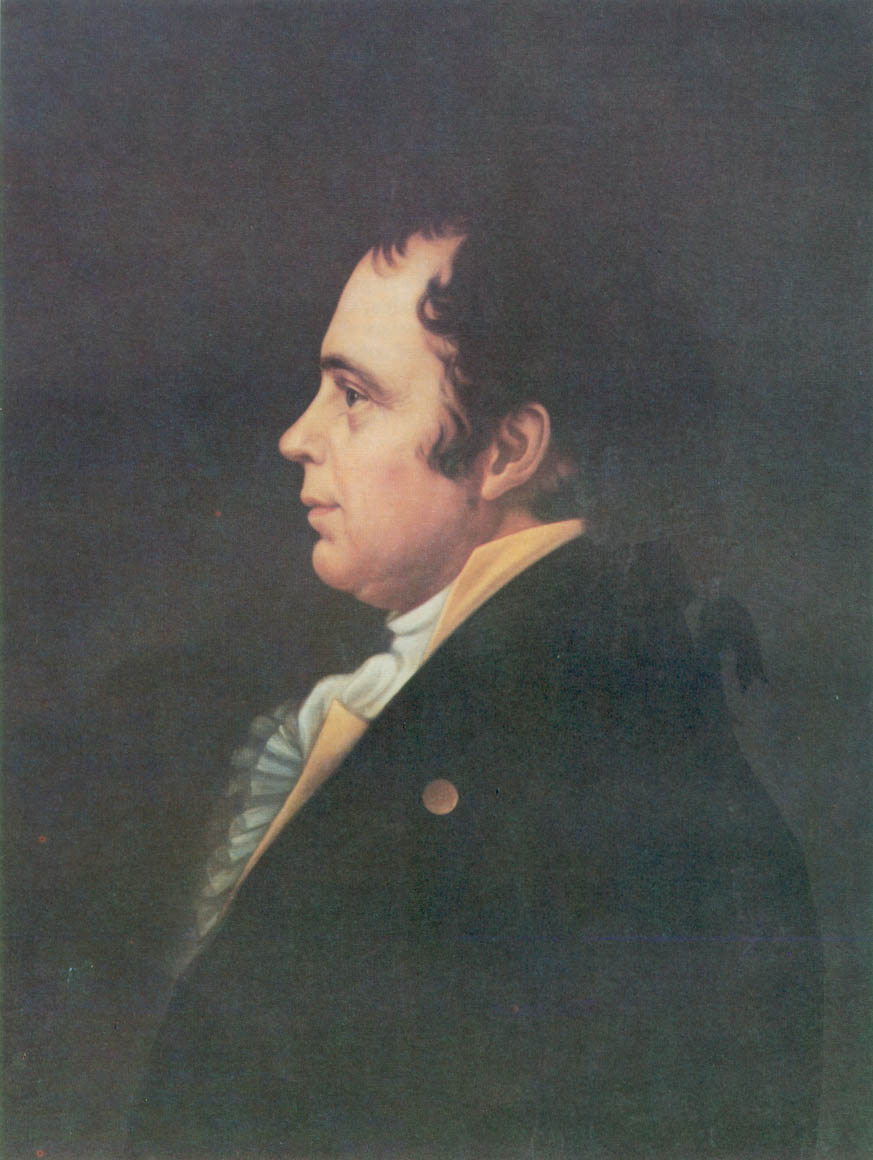

3rd United States Secretary of War
- In office January 27, 1796 – May 13, 1800
- President: George Washington; John Adams
- Preceded by: Timothy Pickering
- Succeeded by: Samuel Dexter

Personal details
- Born: November 16, 1753 Ballymena, Kingdom of Ireland
- Died: May 3, 1816 (aged 62) Baltimore, Maryland, U.S.
- Resting place: Westminster Hall and Burying Ground
- Party: Federalist
- Spouse: Peggy Caldwell

James McHenry (November 16, 1753 – May 3, 1816) was an Scots-Irish American military surgeon, statesman, and a Founding Father of the United States. McHenry was a signer of the United States Constitution from Maryland, initiated the recommendation for Congress to form the Navy, and was the eponym of Fort McHenry. He represented Maryland in the Continental Congress. He was a delegate to the Maryland State Convention of 1788, to vote whether Maryland should ratify the proposed Constitution of the United States. He served as United States Secretary of War from 1796 to 1800, bridging the administrations of George Washington and John Adams. At the time of his death, McHenry owned 10 slaves, most of whom either worked as household servants or maintained his estate.

== Early life and education ==
McHenry was born into a Presbyterian Scots-Irish/Ulster Scots family in Ballymena, County Antrim, Ireland, in 1753. Alarmed that he was becoming sick from excessive studying, his family in 1771 sent him to North America to recuperate. Recent scholarship suggests that the family may have also sent him to the colonies as an "advanced scout" to see if the entire family would wish to relocate, which they did a year later. Upon arrival, McHenry lived with a family friend in Philadelphia before finishing his preparatory education at Newark Academy in Delaware. Afterward, he returned to Philadelphia, where he apprenticed under Benjamin Rush and became a physician.

== Medical career ==
McHenry served as a skilled and dedicated surgeon during the American Revolutionary War. On August 10, 1776, he was appointed surgeon of the Fifth Pennsylvania Battalion, stationed at Fort Washington (New York). He was taken prisoner the following November when the fort was taken by Sir William Howe. While in British custody, he observed that prisoners were given very poor medical attention and initiated reports to that effect, to no avail.

He was paroled in January 1777, then released from parole in March 1778. Having sufficiently impressed George Washington, he was appointed aide as secretary to the commander-in-chief in May 1779. McHenry was present at the Battle of Monmouth. In August 1780, he was transferred to Lafayette's staff, where he remained until he retired from the army in the autumn of 1781.

Although eligible, McHenry did not join The Society of the Cincinnati as an original member when it was established in 1783. His son John was admitted as a member in the state of Maryland in 1816, representing his father.

== Political career ==
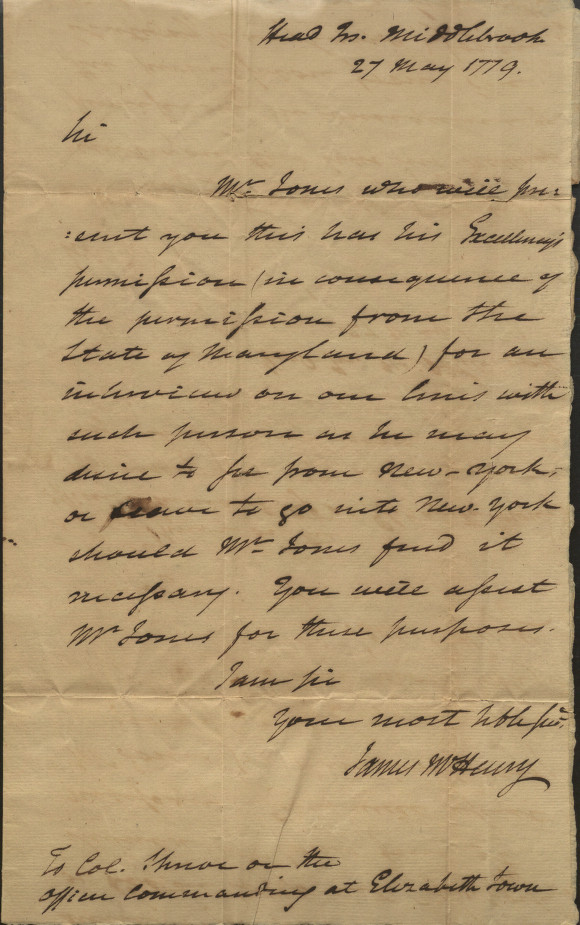
Letter from James Mchenry to Israel Shreve, 1779

He was elected by the legislature to the Maryland Senate on September 17, 1781, and as delegate to Congress on December 2, 1784. In 1787, he was a Maryland delegate to the Constitutional Convention, which drafted the United States Constitution. After a controversial campaign, he was elected to the Maryland House of Delegates on October 10, 1788. Two years later he retired from public life and spent a year actively engaged in mercantile business. On November 15, 1791, he accepted a second term in the Maryland Senate and served five years.

During Washington's second term as president (1793–97), political events created a number of vacancies in his cabinet. After several other candidates had declined the office, Washington appointed McHenry secretary of war in 1796 and immediately assigned him the task of facilitating the transition of Western military posts from Great Britain's control to that of the United States under the terms of the Jay Treaty.

McHenry advised the Senate committee against reducing military forces. He was instrumental in reorganizing the United States Army into four regiments of infantry, a troop of dragoons, and a battery of artillery. He is credited with establishing the United States Department of the Navy, based on his recommendation that the "War Department should be assisted by a commissioner of marine" on March 8, 1798.

During President John Adams's administration (1797–1801), McHenry continued as Secretary of War, as Adams had decided to keep the newly established institution of the presidential cabinet intact. Adams gradually found that three members of the cabinet repeatedly opposed him: McHenry, Secretary of State Timothy Pickering, and Treasury Secretary Oliver Wolcott Jr. They appeared to listen more to Alexander Hamilton than to the president and publicly disagreed with Adams about his foreign policy, particularly with regard to France. Instead of resigning, they stayed in office to work against his official policy. It is unknown if Adams knew they were being disloyal. Although many liked McHenry personally, Washington, Hamilton, and Wolcott were said to have complained of his incompetence as an administrator.

McHenry attributed Adams' troubles as chief executive to his long and frequent absences from the capital, leaving business in the hands of secretaries who bore responsibility without the power to properly conduct it. After a stormy meeting with his cabinet in May 1800, Adams requested McHenry's resignation, which he submitted on May 13. To succeed McHenry, Adams named Samuel Dexter. During the election of 1800, McHenry goaded Hamilton into releasing his indictment against the president, which questioned Adams's loyalty and patriotism, sparking public quarrels over the major candidates and eventually paving the way for Thomas Jefferson to be elected as the next president. The pamphlet leaked past its intended audience, giving the people reason to oppose the Federalists, since that group seemed to be dividing into bitter factions.

== Later life ==
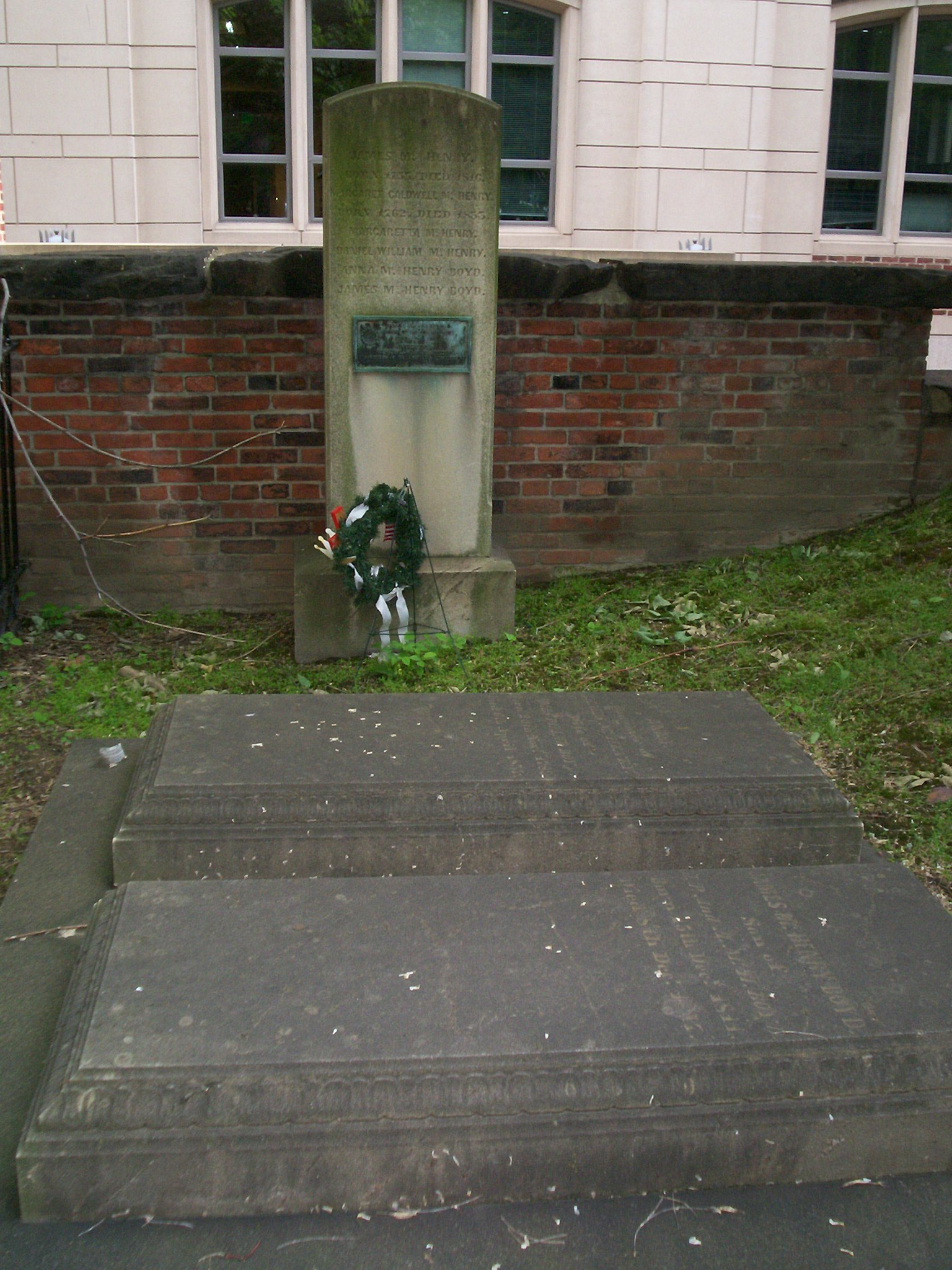
Grave of James McHenry at Westminster Hall and Burying Ground in Baltimore

In 1792, McHenry purchased a 95-acre tract from Ridgely's Delight in Baltimore and named it Fayetteville in honor of his friend, the Marquis de Lafayette; he spent his remaining years there. During that time, McHenry continued frequent correspondence with his friends and associates, in particular Pickering and Benjamin Tallmadge, with whom he maintained Federalist ideals and exchanged progress of the War of 1812.

An attack of paralysis in 1814 left him with severe pain and complete loss of the use of his legs. He died two years later. Upon the death of her beloved husband, Mrs. McHenry wrote:

Here we come to the end of a life of a courteous, high-minded, keen-spirited, Christian gentleman. He was not a great man, but participated in great events and great men loved him, while all men appreciated his goodness and purity of soul. His highest titles to remembrance are that he was faithful to every duty and that he was the intimate and trusted friend of Lafayette, of Hamilton, and of Washington.

== Legacy and honors ==
- Elected member of the American Philosophical Society in January 1786.
- Elected president of the Bible Society of Baltimore in 1813 (later known as the Maryland Bible Society).
- Elected a member of the American Antiquarian Society in July 1815.
- McHenry is memorialized at Independence Hall and the National Constitution Center in Philadelphia.
- Fort McHenry in Baltimore was named after him. A battle there during the War of 1812 inspired Francis Scott Key to write what became the national anthem, "The Star-Spangled Banner".
  - The Fort McHenry Tunnel is named for Fort McHenry which in turn is named for him.
- Henry Street in Madison, Wisconsin, is named in his honor.
- McHenry, Maryland, is named after him.

== See also ==
- List of foreign-born United States Cabinet members

== Notes ==
Political offices
Preceded by Timothy Pickering	United States Secretary of War; 1796–1800	Succeeded by Samuel Dexter
