= Shannon Messenger =

American author

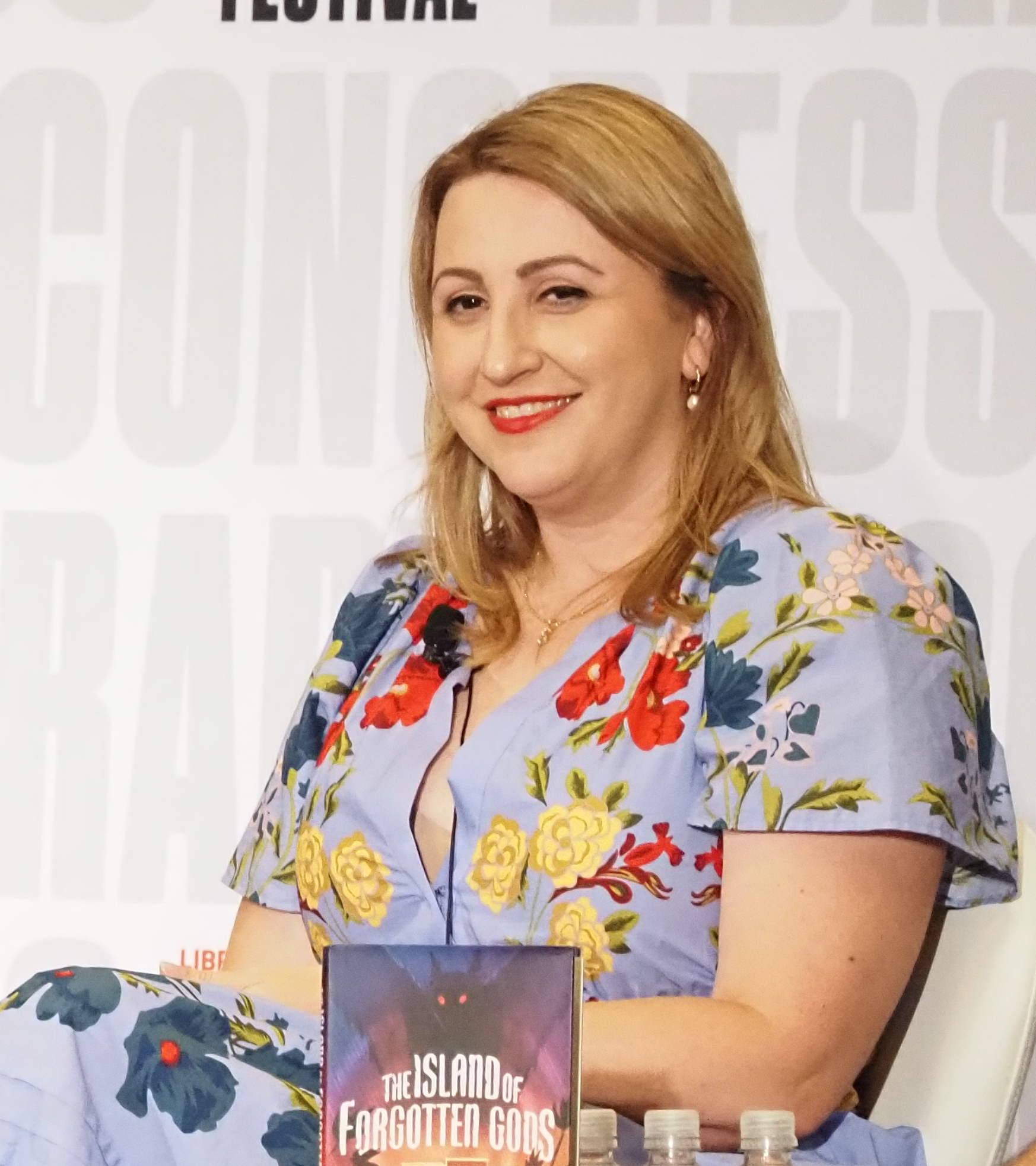
- Messenger in 2026
- Born: November 10, 1981 (age 45)
- Education: USC School of Cinematic Arts
- Occupation: Author
- Writing career
- Genre: Fantasy
- Notable works: Keeper of the Lost Cities series, Sky Fall series
- Website: shannonmessenger.com

Shannon Messenger is an American author. She is known for writing the middle-grade series Keeper of the Lost Cities, which was a New York Times bestseller; Unlocked, book 8.5 in the series, reached number 8 on USA Today's list in 2020. She also wrote the young-adult Sky Fall series. Her books have been published by Simon & Schuster.

== Personal life ==
Shannon Messenger was born in Southern California. When she was young, she moved to San Diego and went to elementary school there. She graduated from the University of Southern California School of Cinematic Arts. Messenger was divorced in November 2018, but still writes under the surname. On May 3, 2021, she announced that she had a son. On June 12, 2023, she announced that she had a daughter.

=== Keeper of the Lost Cities series ===
Keeper of the Lost Cities is an upper-middle-grade fantasy series that has appeared on The New York Times Best Seller list. The first book in the series was an Association for Library Service to Children tween recommended read in 2013. The seventh book in the series, Flashback, had the first printing of 150,000 copies, and Messenger's three-week tour to promote the book drew crowds of 200–700 people per event.

The series tells the story of Sophie Foster, a twelve-year-old high school senior with the ability to read minds. She lives in San Diego until an elvin boy named Fitz Vacker reveals that she is an elf and must leave to go among the elves in the "Lost Cities", a hidden set of cities where elves and other fantasy races and creatures live. She has to leave her human family (who are relocated for their safety), starts school at an elven academy named Foxfire, and stays with an elf couple who later adopts her. She eventually discovers that she has dangerous and illegal secrets hidden in her mind, planted there by the Black Swan, a rebel group who is later revealed to have hidden Sophie originally in the human world. The main antagonist of the series is the Neverseen, an extreme criminal organization. This series shows the adventures of young Sophie and is aimed at children of 10 and above.

The story has continued over nine books as of November 2020, with one book released each year, as well as three short stories in limited editions. The ninth book was released on November 8, 2022, and the series will conclude with a tenth book, planned for end 2028.

1. Keeper of the Lost Cities (October 2, 2012)
2. Exile (October 1, 2013)
3. Everblaze (November 4, 2014)
4. Neverseen (November 3, 2015)
5. Lodestar (November 1, 2016)
6. Nightfall (November 7, 2017)
7. Flashback (November 6, 2018)
8. Legacy (November 5, 2019)
8.5. Unlocked (September 18, 2020)
9. Stellarlune (November 8, 2022)
9.5. Unraveled (December 3, 2024)

In November 2025, Messenger announced the title of the final book will be Elysian.

Unlocked is book number 8.5 in the series and is a departure from the writing style of the previous books, with chapters alternating between Sophie and Keefe's perspectives. Unlocked also includes a series guide and extras like recipes and official art of the characters, drawn by Laura Hollingsworth.

Unraveled is book number 9.5 in the series and is the first book fully narrated from another point of view than Sophie's, being fully narrated by Keefe.

The Barnes & Noble special editions of Nightfall, Flashback and Legacy include short stories from the perspectives of Keefe Sencen, Fitz Vacker, and Tam Song, respectively. The paperback edition of Flashback includes another short story from Keefe's perspective.

In an interview with Denise Davidson of the San Diego Union-Tribune, she answered questions about book 8 of the series, Legacy. There she talked about her characters, as well as saying she tries to let the characters drive the plot.

An illustrated and annotated trade paperback edition of the first book was released on August 25, 2020.

On January 11, 2021, it was announced that Ben Affleck would be directing an adaptation of Keeper of the Lost Cities for Disney.

On April 18, 2024, it was announced that Warner Bros. Entertainment Inc. had landed the rights to the Keeper of the Lost Cities adaptation, with Emma Watts serving as producer and Messenger serving as executive producer.

=== Sky Fall series ===
The Sky Fall series is a young adult fantasy series about seventeen-year-old Vane Weston, who learns he is a sylph, a wind spirit. He is betrothed to Solana, heir to the throne, but falls in love with Audra, who had been assigned to protect him. As the last remaining sylph with the power to speak to the Westerly winds, Vane must use them to defeat the evil and power-hungry Raiden. He struggles through many challenges, and while trying to defeat Raiden, he also must protect Audra and their relationship, even though most others are against it.

The series is a trilogy.

1. Let the Sky Fall (2013)
2. Let the Storm Break (2014)
3. Let the Wind Rise (2016)

== Awards ==
Keeper of the Lost Cities won the 2017 Middle School/Junior High California Young Reader Medal.

== Critical reception ==
Reviews of Messenger's works have been mixed. Kirkus found Keeper of the Lost Cities to be "wholesome shading to bland," but with "exotic creatures and locales, plus an agreeable cast" and described Exile as a "cumbersome coming of age tale".

The Publishers Weekly review of Let the Sky Fall did not like the story's pacing and said that the "novel works best when Messenger’s characters are left to explore her vividly imagined world of wind, rather than just talk about it." Kirkus was more positive, stating that "Characterization elevates this romance over similar offerings in a crowded genre". Kirkus remained positive about Let the Storm Break, writing, "Witty, romantic and filled with personality — after the slow start."
