= USCGC Dexter =

Dexter has been the name of more than one ship of the United States Revenue Cutter Service and United States Coast Guard, and may refer to:

- USRC Dexter (1830), a cutter in commission in the Revenue Cutter Service from 1830 to 1841
- USRC Dexter (1874), a cutter in commission in the Revenue Cutter Service from 1874 to 1908
- USCGC Dexter (1925), a cutter in commission in the Coast Guard from 1925 to 1936
- USCGC Dexter (WAVP-385), previously WAGC-18, later WHEC-385, a cutter in commission in the Coast Guard from 1946 to 1952 and from 1958 to 1968
