= Simon Newton Dexter =

American politician

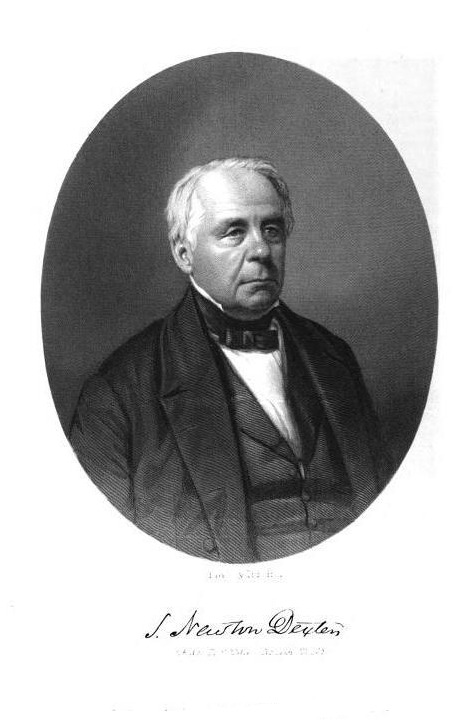
- Born: May 11, 1785; Providence, Rhode Island
- Died: November 18, 1862 (aged 77); Whitesboro, Oneida County, New York
- Education: Brown University
- Occupations: Merchant; Politician
- Parent(s): Andrew Dexter; Mary (Newton) Dexter
- Relatives: Samuel Dexter (uncle); Andrew Dexter Jr. (brother)

Simon Newton Dexter (May 11, 1785 – November 18, 1862) was an American merchant and a New York politician.

== Life ==
He was the son of Andrew Dexter, the first American manufacturer of cotton goods.

He matriculated at Brown University, but soon left that institution to engage in business in Boston. In 1815, he removed to Whitesboro, and in 1817 took part in the construction of a section of the Erie Canal. From 1824 to 1829, he was engaged in the construction of the Chesapeake and Delaware Canal.

On returning to Whitesboro he became agent of the Oriskany Manufacturing Company, and in 1832 assumed charge of the Dexter Company. He was also largely interested in manufactures elsewhere in the State of New York and in Elgin, Illinois.

In 1840, he was elected by the New York State Legislature one of the canal commissioners, and remained in office until 1842 when the new Democratic majority removed the Whig commissioners.

He was a trustee of Hamilton College, and for several years supported a professorship, giving the College in all about $32,000. He was President of the Whitestown Bank from 1833 to 1853, and Manager of the State Lunatic Asylum at Utica from 1849 to 1862.

His papers are in the Cornell University Library.

U.S. Secretary of the Treasury Samuel Dexter was his uncle. Andrew Dexter Jr. was his brother.

== Legacy ==
Simon Newton Dexter is the namesake of Dexter, New York.

== Sources ==
- famousamericans.net/simonnewtondexter/ Bio from Appleton's Encyclopedia
- Obituary of his grandson Newton Dexter (1848–1899) in NYT on February 22, 1899
- Guide to the Simon Newton Dexter Papers
- History of Jefferson County, NY
- The New York Civil List compiled by Franklin Benjamin Hough (page 42; Weed, Parsons and Co., 1858)
