= Dexter Davis =

Dexter Davis may refer to:

- Dexter Davis (defensive back) (born 1970), American football player
- Dexter Davis (defensive end) (born 1986), American football player
- Dexter Davis Jr. (born 1990), American football player
