= Mineral cosmetics =

Mineral cosmetics are forms of make-up that are composed of compressed minerals. Most of these products are pure mineral, and do not contain any oil or wax additives. The claim that applying minerals directly to the skin in the form of cosmetics has health benefits is scientifically controversial.
