= Dexterity (video game) =

1990 video game

Dexterity Funny Field
- North American cover art
- Developer: SNK
- Publisher: SNK
- Platform: Game Boy
- Release: JP: June 15, 1990; NA: July 1990; EU: 1990
- Genre: Puzzle
- Modes: Single-player; Multiplayer

Dexterity, known as Funny Field (ファニーフィールド) in Japan, is a puzzle video game released by SNK for the Game Boy in 1990. The game consists of a square-shaped floor covered in seven rows and eight columns of tiles (56 tiles in total). The goal of the game is to flip all of the light tiles into dark tiles. There are several enemies as the level advances. The game has a total of 30 rounds.
