= Iris Dexter =

Australian journalist, war correspondent

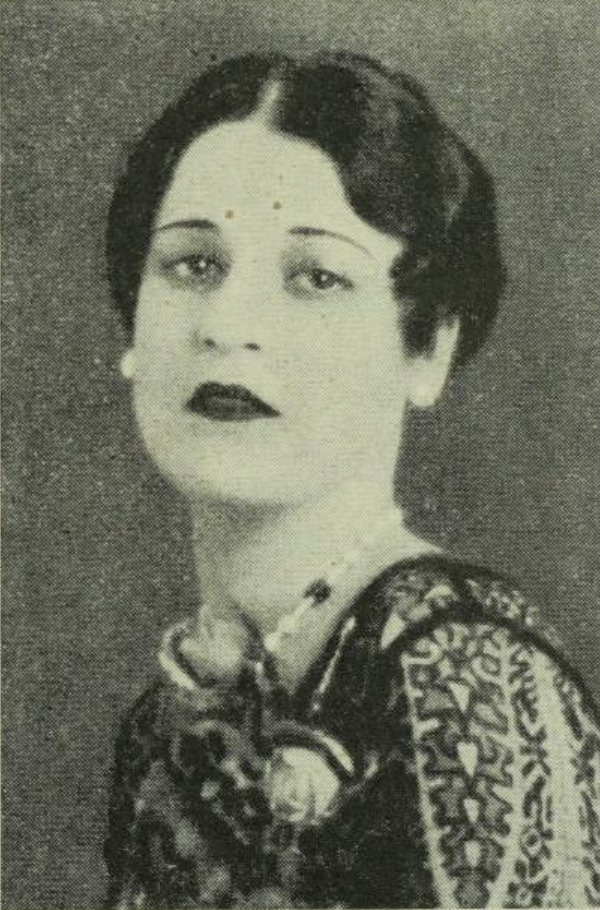
- In 1928
- Born: Iris Chapman Norton; 1907
- Died: 24 March 1974 (aged 66–67)
- Occupations: Journalist and war correspondent

Iris Dexter (also known as Iris Norton and Iris Norton Dexter, 1907 – 24 March 1974) was an Australian journalist and a war correspondent during World War II.

== Life ==
Dexter was born Iris Chapman Norton in Sydney, Australia, in 1907. At the age of 15, she convinced the editors of the Sunday Times to give her a job editing the comics section, and progressed to editing Photoplay. She then became the publicity manager for Hoyts Pictures and also appeared as a movie reviewer for Sydney radio station 2BL, and wrote a movie column for The Sydney Mail. She married Harry Dexter, sporting editor at The Sun in 1928.

By the late 1930s, Dexter was a freelance reporter for Sydney newspapers The Sunday Telegraph, the Sunday Sun and Guardian and Smith's Weekly and wrote a regular column for the ABC Weekly. In 1940, she became a general reporter for the Melbourne Picture-News; she was the only woman general reporter on the staff. In September of the same year, Dexter joined the editorial staff of Woman magazine; she wrote both serious articles and humorous ones, under the pen-name Margot Parker, for almost every edition of the magazine for many years.

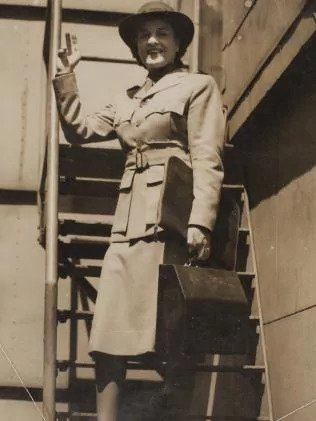
Iris Dexter in 1943 when she was based in Australia boarding a plane

In 1942 and 1943, Dexter was officially accredited as a war correspondent in Australia for publisher Associated Newspapers, and travelled parts of the country such as North Queensland to report on military operations. In November 1943, she was present on the dock in Melbourne when an Australian infantry regiment returned from fighting in New Guinea. Her description of the soldiers' poor physical appearance and clearly disturbed emotional and mental state was a rare reminder to her readers of the damaging effects of war service. While in the role of war correspondent, her pen-name journalist Margot Parker introduced readers to another reporter, 'Frenzia Frisby', which enabled Dexter to write about her role from a humorous perspective. After the war ended she was sent on a tour of South-East Asia to report on the conditions of newly released Australian prisoners of war. Her tour included Singapore, Java, Ceylon, Batavia and Morotai; she also met and wrote about a group of nurses who had been imprisoned in Sumatra and were recovering in Singapore.

Dexter continued to write for Woman, and later Woman's Day, until her death in Sydney in 1974. Her personal papers are held at the State Library of New South Wales.
