= Dexter House =

Dexter House may refer to:

- David Dexter House, Claremont, New Hampshire
- Edward Dexter House, Providence, Rhode Island
- Jeremiah Dexter House, Providence, Rhode Island
- Dexter House (Houston, Texas), listed on the National Register of Historic Places in Harris County, Texas
