= Dexter Jackson =

Dexter Jackson is the name of:

- Dexter Jackson (bodybuilder) (born 1969), American bodybuilder
- Dexter Jackson (safety) (born 1977), American football safety
- Dexter Jackson (wide receiver) (born 1986), American football wide receiver
- Dexter Jackson (linebacker) (born 1988), Arena football linebacker
