= Andrew Dexter Jr. =

American lawyer

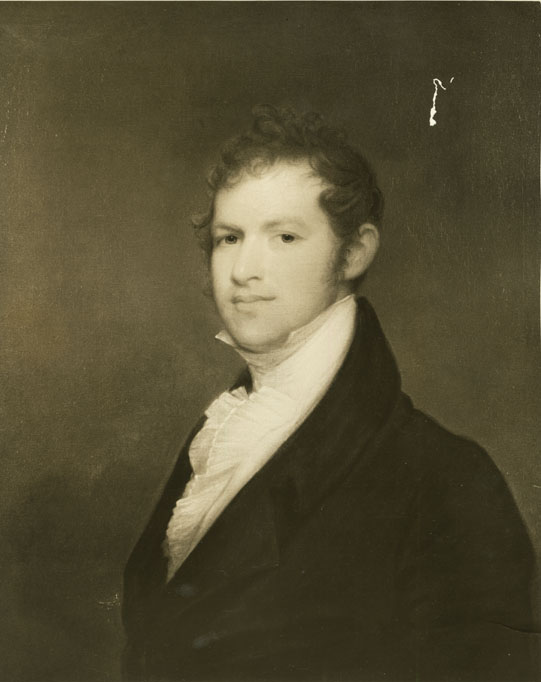
- 1808 portrait by Gilbert Stuart
- Born: Andrew Dexter Jr. March 28, 1779; Brookfield, Massachusetts
- Died: November 2, 1837 (aged 58); Mobile, Alabama
- Education: Brown University
- Occupations: Attorney; Businessman; Land speculator
- Years active: 1798-1837
- Known for: Commission of one of the first large-scale financial frauds in the United States
- Notable work: Exchange Coffee House, Boston, Massachusetts
- Spouse: Charlotte Morton (1787-1819) (m. 1808-1819, her death)
- Children: 3
- Parent(s): Andrew Dexter (1751-1811); Mary (Newton) Dexter (1757-1825)
- Relatives: Samuel Dexter (uncle); Simon Newton Dexter (brother); Perez Morton (father-in-law)

Andrew Dexter Jr. (March 28, 1779 – November 2, 1837), was an American lawyer, financier, and speculator. He is known for committing one of the first major financial frauds in the United States, and for being the founder of Montgomery, Alabama.

A graduate of Brown University, Dexter was admitted to the bar and briefly practiced law before turning to business and financial speculation. Around 1805 he conceived the idea of a large office building with public meeting space, and began construction of the Exchange Coffee House in Boston. Dexter resorted to printing massive quantities of worthless bank notes to pay for construction and operation of the building; when his fraud was uncovered, he lost control of the venture and fled the country to escape his creditors. He later returned from Canada, and lived in New York while he worked to repair his finances and settle his debts.

Following the death of his father, Dexter inherited a claim in the Yazoo lands. At the 1817 Yazoo lands auction, he purchased several hundred acres along the Alabama River, and settled a town he called New Philadelphia. When Alabama joined the Union in 1819, Dexter's town was renamed Montgomery. He lived there and continued trying to achieve success in business and land speculation, but his circumstances continued to rise and fall with turns in the economy. He died in Mobile, Alabama in 1837, and was again near poverty as the result of setbacks caused by the Panic of 1837. Dexter was buried in Mobile, but the exact location of his gravesite is not known.

== Early life ==
The son of Mary (Newton) Dexter and Andrew Dexter Sr., a successful merchant and one of the first cloth manufacturers in America, the younger Dexter was born in Brookfield, Massachusetts, on March 28, 1779. He was raised in Providence, Rhode Island and graduated from Brown University in 1798. He then studied law in the office of his uncle Samuel Dexter, was admitted to the bar, and became an attorney in Boston.

== Career ==
In the early 1800s Dexter left the law to become involved in business and finance. In 1807 he began construction of the Exchange Coffee House. At seven stories, the tallest building in Boston at the time, the site was planned as a location for business offices, reading rooms, conference rooms and dining rooms to facilitate public meetings and the transaction of business. In Dexter's concept, the Exchange Coffee House would also provide a service by helping establish the relative value of the bank notes of the various financial institutions in and around Boston.

At the time, banks transacted business by issuing paper notes that could be redeemed for their value in gold or silver. Banks, merchants, businessmen and workers generally exchanged the notes between each other at a discount to facilitate commercial transactions, and the discounts varied widely depending on each bank's reputation, its distance from the locality where business was being conducted, and other factors. Traders in bank notes in the Boston area set the local discount rate by conducting business in outdoor meetings on several city streets. Dexter intended for the bank note traders to formalize their business by providing them indoor space at the Coffee House.

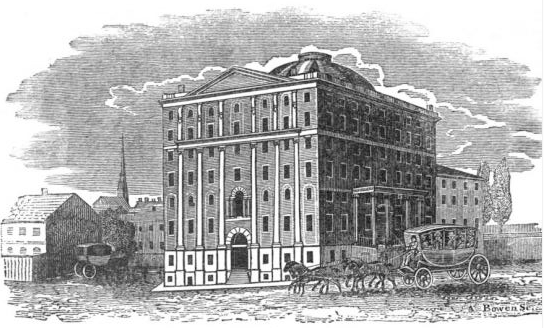
Engraving of Boston's Exchange Coffee House, which Dexter was responsible for constructing

To finance the construction of the Exchange Coffee House, Dexter took advantage of this unregulated system by starting or gaining control of banks located far from Boston, including rural Rhode Island, Western Massachusetts, New Hampshire, Maine and Michigan, and issuing bank notes that far exceeded the banks' gold and silver deposits. His intent was to circulate in Boston bank notes from locations so far away that no one would ever attempt to redeem them. This meant that he could issue bank notes in unlimited quantities, as long as no one suspected there was not sufficient specie to back them.

In 1807 President Thomas Jefferson implemented an embargo against Great Britain and France as a protest against violations of American neutrality during the Napoleonic Wars. Business in the United States slowed as a result, and holders of bank notes began to redeem them for specie. In addition, the traders in bank notes whom Dexter hoped to entice into the Exchange Coffee House to conduct their business preferred to continue working outdoors, so he did not realize the increased customer traffic and rents he anticipated.

Becoming suspicious of Dexter's machinations, in 1808 a group of Boston merchants led by Nathan Appleton took their story to the press. As a result, shopkeepers began to refuse the bills issued by Dexter's banks, meaning he could no longer pay suppliers and workmen. Appleton and his allies then paid individuals called "runners" to travel throughout the country, turning in to the issuing institutions the bank notes the Boston merchants had accepted as payment for goods and services and demanding payment in specie. When the banks proved unable to redeem their paper currency, they collapsed. By 1809 the extent of Dexter's fraud became widely known, and his wife and he fled to Nova Scotia to avoid prosecution.

Ownership of the Exchange Coffee House passed on to other investors, and it remained open and partially occupied until it was destroyed in an 1818 fire.

== Later life ==
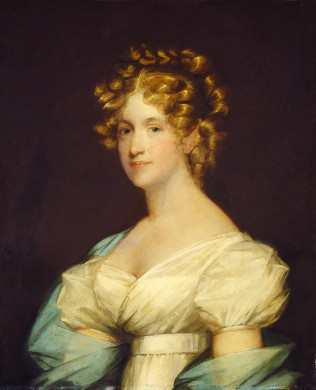
Charlotte Morton Dexter, by Gilbert Stuart (1808)

Dexter later relocated to Athens, New York, where he lived with his father and brother, who assisted him in using New York's lenient bankruptcy laws to partially satisfy his creditors and rebuild his finances.

Dexter's father died in 1811 and Dexter inherited his father's claims to purchase at a discount lands in Georgia and what is now Alabama (part of the Yazoo lands). At the 1817 auctions in Milledgeville, Georgia, which followed the end of the War of 1812, Dexter bought several hundred acres on the east bank of the Alabama River near a Creek Indian trading post, where he founded a town called New Philadelphia. When Alabama entered the union in 1819 Dexter's town was renamed Montgomery.

Charlotte Dexter, Andrew's wife, died in 1819 just weeks after their arrival in Alabama, probably from yellow fever. Dexter sometimes raised their three children, and sometimes left them in the care of relatives. He engaged in farming, buying and selling land, and other ventures, including land speculation in Texas and Mexico. His fortunes waxed and waned as the economy rose and fell. At the time of his death he was once again near poverty, his fortunes reduced during the Panic of 1837.

== Death and burial ==
Dexter died of yellow fever in Mobile, Alabama, on November 2, 1837. He is known to have been buried in Mobile, but the exact location is not known and attempts to locate it have been unsuccessful.

== Family ==
Andrew Dexter Jr. was the nephew of Samuel Dexter, the brother of Simon Newton Dexter, and the son in law of Perez Morton and poet Sarah Wentworth Morton. His son Andrew Alfred Dexter (1809–1853), who was born in Nova Scotia while Andrew Dexter Jr. lived there to avoid his creditors, was the founder of Aiken, South Carolina.
