= Walter Dexter =

Walter Dexter may refer to:

- Walter F. Dexter (1886–1945), American educator and politician
- Walter Dexter (Canadian artist) (1931–2015), Canadian ceramic artist
- Walter L. Dexter (1841–1920), member of the Wisconsin State Assembly
- Walter Dexter (British artist) (1876–1958), British artist
