= USS Dextrous =

USS Dextrous has been the name of two ships of the United States Navy.

- USS Dextrous (AM-341), an Auk-class minesweeper built in 1943.
- USS Dextrous (MCM-13), an Avenger-class mine countermeasures ship, commissioned in 1993 and decommissioned in 2025.
