= USRC Dexter (1830) =

- A Morris-Taney class Revenue Cutter

History

United States
- Namesake: Samuel Dexter (1761-1816)
- Builder: Webb and Allen, New York
- Commissioned: 1830
- Decommissioned: 25 February 1841
- Homeport: Norfolk, Virginia, Charleston, South Carolina; Mobile, Alabama
- Fate: sold 1841

General characteristics
- Class & type: Schooner
- Displacement: 112 tons
- Length: 73.4 ft (22.4 m)
- Beam: 20.6 ft (6.3 m)
- Draft: 9.7 ft (3.0 m)
- Propulsion: sail
- Sail plan: topsail schooner
- Crew: 20-24 officers and men
- Armament: (4) 6 x 9 pndrs (typical of class)

The United States Revenue Cutter Dexter was one of 13 cutters of the Morris-Taney Class to be launched. Named after Secretaries of the Treasury and Presidents of the United States, these cutters were the backbone of the Service for more than a decade. Samuel Humphreys designed these cutters for roles as diverse as fighting pirates, privateers, combating smugglers and operating with naval forces. He designed the vessels on a naval schooner concept. They had Baltimore Clipper lines. The vessels built by Webb and Allen, designed by Isaac Webb, resembled Humphreys' but had one less port.

The Dexter began her career working for the Collector of Customs in Norfolk, Virginia. She later worked in Charleston, South Carolina and sailed for Mobile, Alabama in April 1833. The following year she operated with the US Navy, cruising on the west coast of Florida during the Seminole War. She operated up the rivers and transported troops to trouble spots. In September 1837, she returned to Mobile and later in 1838, again worked out of Charleston. In December 1840, Dexter was reported unseaworthy and the Government sold the cutter on 25 February 1841.
