= Samuel Dexter =

American politician (1761–1816)

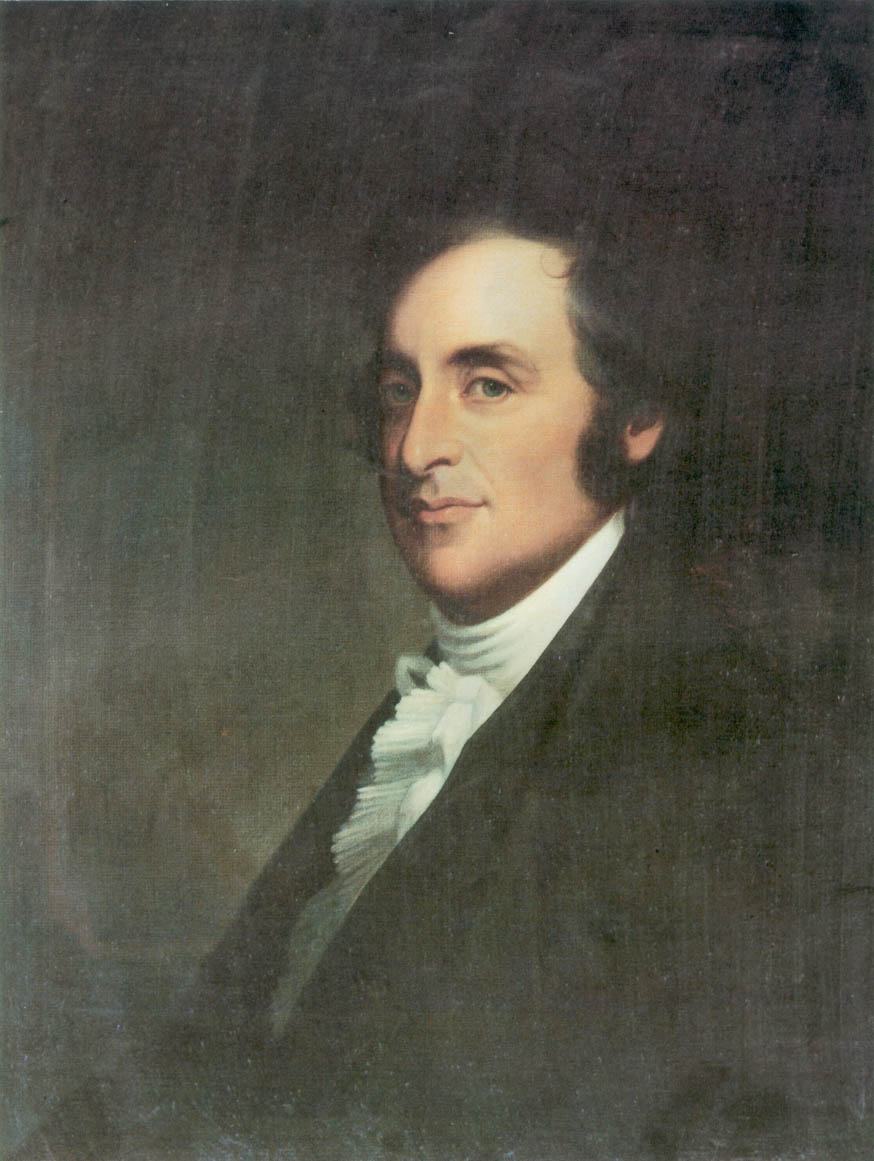

3rd United States Secretary of the Treasury
- In office January 1, 1801 – May 13, 1801
- President: John Adams; Thomas Jefferson
- Preceded by: Oliver Wolcott
- Succeeded by: Albert Gallatin

4th United States Secretary of War
- In office June 1, 1800 – January 31, 1801
- President: John Adams
- Preceded by: James McHenry
- Succeeded by: Henry Dearborn

United States Senator from Massachusetts
- In office March 4, 1799 – May 30, 1800
- Preceded by: Theodore Sedgwick
- Succeeded by: Dwight Foster

Member of the U.S. House of Representatives from Massachusetts's 1st district
- In office March 4, 1793 – March 3, 1795 Serving with Fisher Ames, Benjamin Goodhue, and Samuel Holten (General Ticket)
- Preceded by: Fisher Ames
- Succeeded by: Theodore Sedgwick

Member of the Massachusetts House of Representatives
- In office 1788–1790

Personal details
- Born: May 14, 1761 Boston, Massachusetts, British America
- Died: May 4, 1816 (aged 54) Athens, New York, U.S.
- Resting place: Mount Auburn Cemetery, Cambridge, Massachusetts
- Party: Federalist (before 1812); Democratic-Republican (from 1812)
- Spouse: Katharine Gordon (m. 1786)
- Children: 4
- Education: Harvard University (BA)
- Occupation: Attorney

Coat of Arms of Samuel Dexter

Samuel Dexter (May 14, 1761 – May 4, 1816) was an early American statesman who served both in Congress and in the Presidential Cabinets of John Adams and Thomas Jefferson. A native of Boston, Massachusetts, Dexter was a 1781 graduate of Harvard College. After receiving his degree he studied law, attained admission to the bar in 1784, and began to practice in Lunenburg, Massachusetts.

A Federalist, Dexter served in the Massachusetts House of Representatives from 1788 to 1790. In 1792 he was elected to the United States House of Representatives, and he served in the 3rd United States Congress. The state legislature subsequently elected Dexter to the United States Senate, and he served from March 1799 to May 1800. Dexter resigned his senate seat to accept appointment as the fourth United States Secretary of War, and he served from 1800 to 1801. In January 1801, Dexter was appointed the third United States Secretary of the Treasury, and he served until resigning on the day before his fortieth birthday.

After leaving office, Dexter practiced law in Washington, D.C. until he returned to Boston in 1805. Dexter joined the Democratic-Republican Party because of its support for the War of 1812, and he was a candidate for governor in 1814 and 1815. In 1815, Dexter declined President James Madison's appointment as Minister to Spain. He was a candidate for governor again in 1816, but died on May 4, 1816, aged 54, while visiting his son in Athens, New York. Dexter was buried at Mount Auburn Cemetery in Cambridge, Massachusetts.

== Early life and education ==
Born in Boston in the Province of Massachusetts Bay, to Samuel Dexter, a Massachusetts politician and Hannah (Sigourney) Dexter. He was the grandson of Samuel Dexter, the fourth minister of Dedham. Dexter graduated from Harvard University in 1781 and then studied law in Worcester under Levi Lincoln Sr., the future Attorney General of the United States. After he passed the bar in 1784, he began practicing in Lunenburg, Massachusetts.

== Congressional career ==
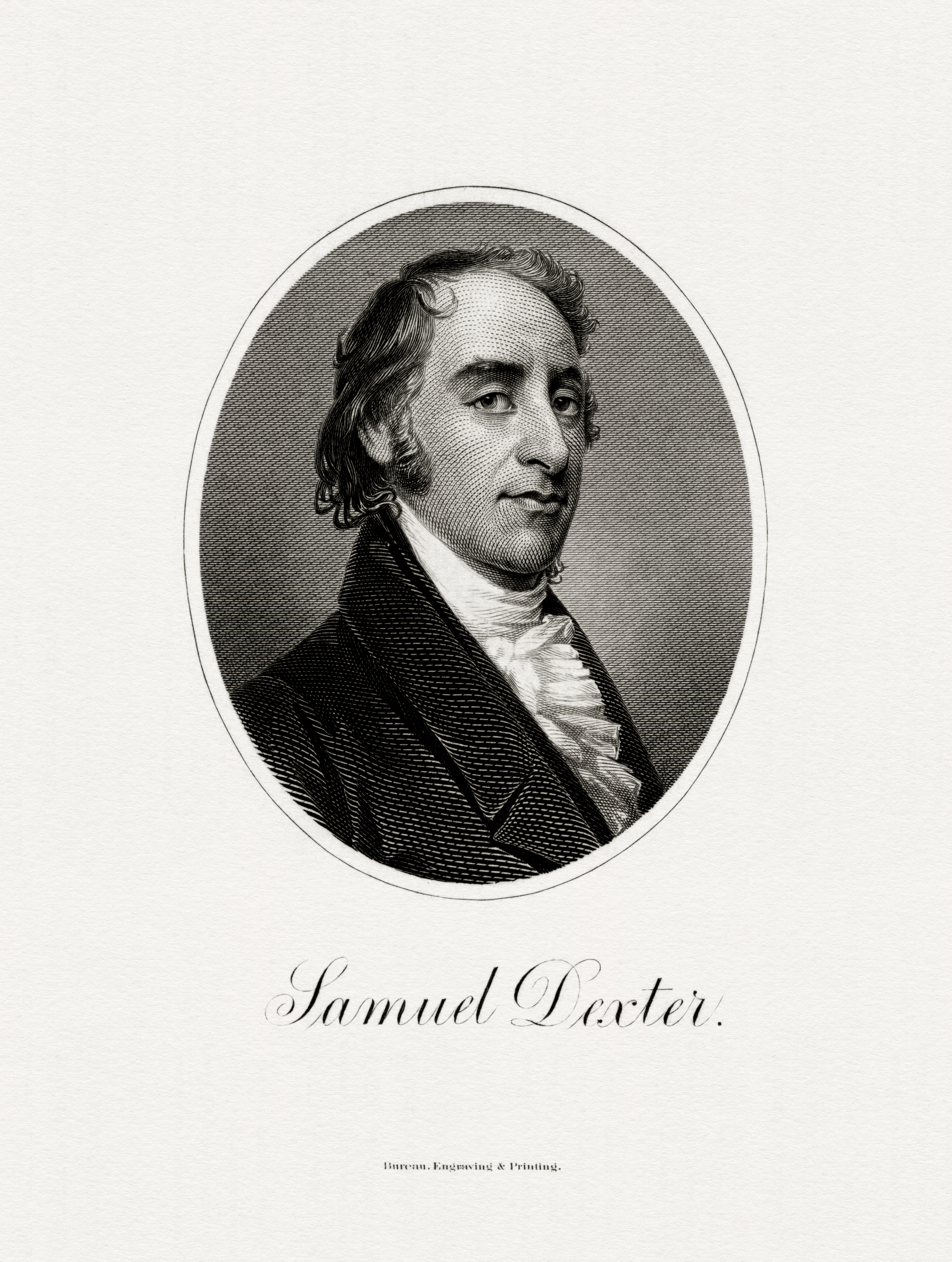
Line engraving of Dexter from a US Treasury specimen book, c. 1902

He was elected to the Massachusetts House of Representatives and served from 1788 to 1790. He was elected to the United States House of Representatives as a Federalist, serving in the 3rd Congress. He served in the United States Senate from March 4, 1799, to May 30, 1800 (the 6th Congress). Between his terms in Congress, he unsuccessfully ran in the 9th congressional district in 1796.

During a House discussion on a Naturalization Bill in 1795, Virginia Representative William Branch Giles controversially suggested that all immigrants be forced to take an oath renouncing any titles of nobility they previously held. Dexter responded by questioning why Catholics were not required to denounce allegiance to the Pope, because priestcraft had initiated more problems throughout history than aristocracy. Dexter's points caused an infuriated James Madison to defend American Catholics, many of whom, such as Charles Carroll of Carrollton, had been good citizens during the American Revolution, and to point out that hereditary titles were barred under the Constitution in any event.

In December 1799, he wrote the Senate eulogy for George Washington. Dexter served in the Senate for less than a year, and resigned in order to accept his appointment as United States Secretary of War in the administration of President John Adams.

== Tenures as Secretaries of War and the Treasury ==
During his time at the War Department he urged congressional action to permit appointment and compensation of field officers for general staff duty.

When Secretary of the Treasury Oliver Wolcott Jr. resigned in December 1800, Adams appointed Dexter as interim secretary, and Dexter served from January to May 1801. With incoming President Thomas Jefferson wanting to delay his choice for Secretary of the Treasury, Albert Gallatin, for a recess appointment in May, Dexter agreed to retain his duties as Secretary of the Treasury for the first two months of Jefferson's term. In a letter to his wife on March 5, 1801, Gallatin said that Dexter had behaved "with great civility."

== Later life ==
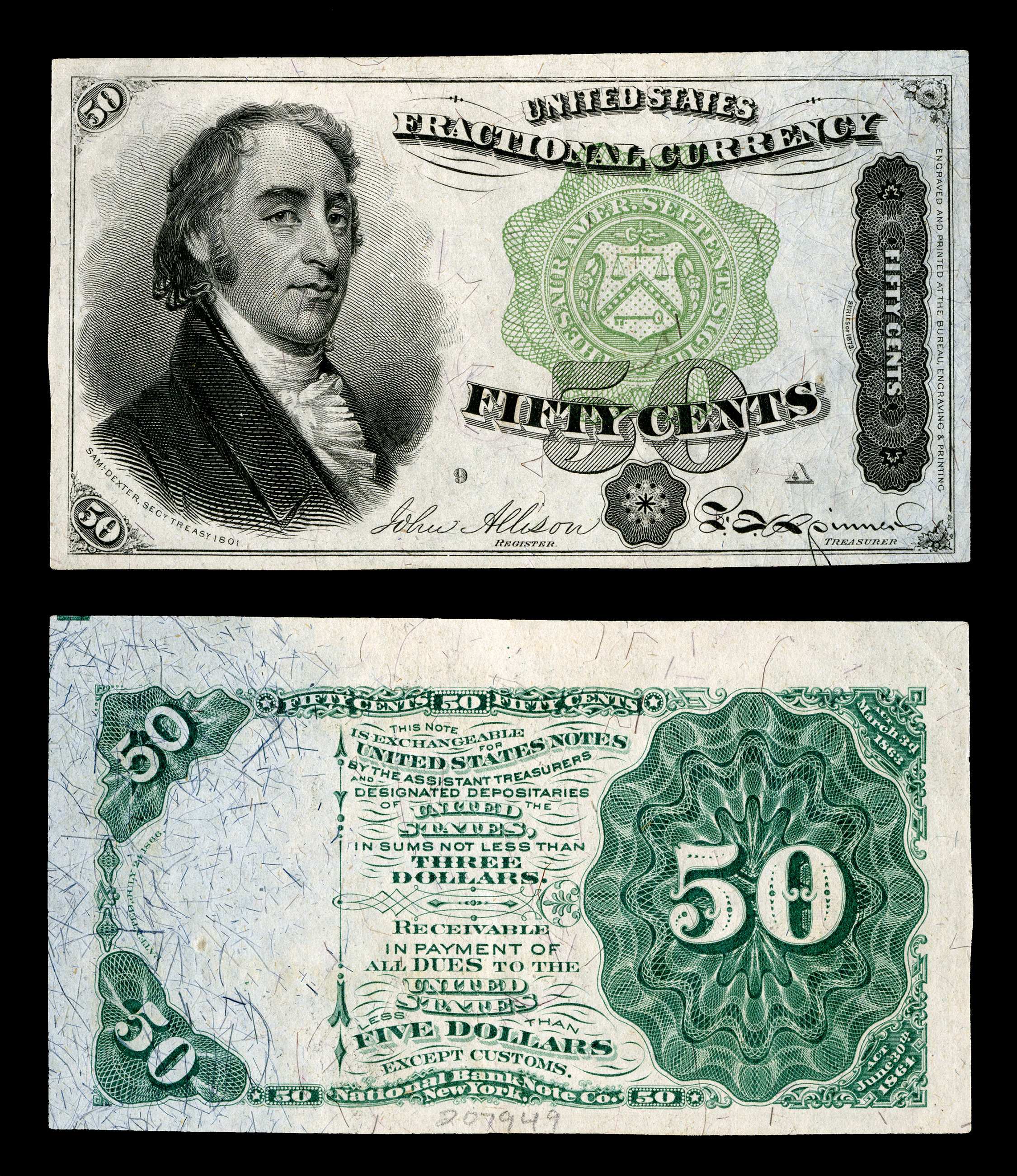
Dexter depicted on US fractional currency

He returned to Boston in 1805 and resumed the practice of law. He also invested in the Dedham Manufacturing Company.

He left the Federalists and became a Democratic-Republican because he supported the War of 1812. He was an unsuccessful candidate for Governor of Massachusetts in 1814, 1815 and 1816.

Dexter was an ardent supporter of the temperance movement and presided over its first formal organization in Massachusetts. He was elected a Fellow of the American Academy of Arts and Sciences in 1800.

== Death and legacy ==
Dexter died at the age of fifty-four in Athens, New York on May 4, 1816, ten days shy of his fifty-fifth birthday. This was also a day after his Secretary of War predecessor, Oliver Wolcott, died. He was buried at Mount Auburn Cemetery in Cambridge, Massachusetts.

Simon Newton Dexter and Andrew Dexter Jr. were his nephews.

Samuel W. Dexter, founder of Dexter, Michigan, was his son.

Samuel Dexter is the namesake of Dexter, Maine. The USRC Dexter (1830) was named in his honor.

U.S. House of Representatives
| Preceded by Fisher Ames | Member of the U.S. House of Representatives; Massachusetts's 1st congressional district 1793–1795 | Succeeded by Theodore Sedgwick |
U.S. Senate
| Preceded by Theodore Sedgwick | U.S. Senator (Class 2) from Massachusetts; 1799–1800; Served alongside: Benjamin Goodhue | Succeeded by Dwight Foster |
Political offices
| Preceded by James McHenry | United States Secretary of War; 1800–1801 | Succeeded by Henry Dearborn |
| Preceded by Oliver Wolcott | United States Secretary of the Treasury; 1801 | Succeeded by Albert Gallatin |
