= Keeper of the Lost Cities =

Series of children's fantasy books

- The logo as used on covers of books in the series
- Keeper of the Lost Cities; Exile; Everblaze; Neverseen; Lodestar; Nightfall; Flashback; Legacy; Unlocked; Stellarlune; Unravelled
- Author: Shannon Messenger
- Cover artist: Jason Chan
- Country: United States
- Language: English
- Genre: Juvenile fiction
- Publisher: Simon & Schuster
- No. of books: 11
- Website: keeperofthelostcities.com

Keeper of the Lost Cities is an upper-middle-grade fantasy series by Shannon Messenger that has appeared on the New York Times Best Seller list for a total of ten weeks.

== Plot summary ==
The protagonist of the series, Sophie, is a twelve-year-old elf with telepathy who lives in San Diego, California with a human family.

In the first book, Sophie, while on a school field trip, is tracked down by a teenage elf, Fitz, who reveals that she is an elf. He discusses the reality of their world with Sophie and tells her that she has to move to the Lost Cities—a place unknown to humankind where elves, trolls, ogres, goblins, gnomes and dwarves live in harmony. She is forced to leave her human family behind and stay with an elvin couple, Grady and Edaline, who later adopt her. She starts school at a noble elvin academy named Foxfire.

The main conflict in the series is between the Black Swan, a rebel organization, and the Neverseen, a group of criminal extremists. Sophie learns that the Black Swan are her creators, and that her old neighbor from the human world, Mr. Forkle, is the director of the Black Swan's Project Moonlark, in which she was created. Her biological parents are unknown due to catastrophes that could be created if their identities are discovered.

== Series ==
=== Main series ===
The series currently consists of nine novels and two novellas, Unlocked and Unraveled.

1. Keeper of the Lost Cities (October 2, 2012)
2. Exile (October 1, 2013)
3. Everblaze (November 4, 2014)
4. Neverseen (November 3, 2015)
5. Lodestar (November 1, 2016)
6. Nightfall (November 7, 2017)
7. Flashback (November 6, 2018)
8. Legacy (November 5, 2019)
  8.5. Unlocked (November 17, 2020)
9. Stellarlune (November 8, 2022)
  9.5. Unraveled (December 3, 2024)

=== Graphic novel adaptation ===
A graphic novel adaptation to Keeper, adapted by Celina Frenn and illustrated by Gabriella Chianello, was released on November 7, 2023, covering half of the first book. Part 2, illustrated by Valeria Tenaga Romanazzi, covered the remainder of the novel and released on December 2, 2025.

=== Reception ===
The series has a largely positive reception. Kirkus Reviews said that the first book was "wholesome shading to bland, but well-stocked with exotic creatures and locales." Booklist Reviews called it an "exciting start to a promising series."

=== Film adaptation ===
On January 11, 2021, it was announced that Ben Affleck would be directing an adaptation of Keeper of the Lost Cities for Walt Disney Pictures.

On April 18, 2024, it was announced that Warner Bros. Pictures had landed the rights to the Keeper of the Lost Cities adaptation, with Emma Watts serving as producer and Messenger serving as executive producer.

== Characters ==
- Sophie Foster: The main protagonist of the series. Her genes were edited, giving her unusually powerful abilities. She was raised by humans after this experimentation and brought back to the Lost Cities at the age of twelve. She is a Telepath, Inflictor, Polyglot, Teleporter, and Enhancer.
- Keefe Sencen: Sophie's close friend. His mother, Gisela, is one of the series' main antagonists. He is known for his mischievousness and humor. He is an Empath, allowing him to read people's emotions upon physical contact.
- Fitzroy "Fitz" Vacker: Sophie's close friend, a highly skilled Telepath. He belongs to a prominent family of Elvin nobility.
- Dexter "Dex" Alvin Dizznee: Sophie's best friend; also a talented alchemist and Technopath.
- Biana Vacker: Sophie's enemy-turned-friend and Fitz's younger sister. She is a Vanisher, allowing her to turn invisible.
- Tam Song: Sophie's friend who she met at Exillium, a school for banished elves. He is a Shade, capable of manipulating shadows, and Linh's twin brother.
- Linh Song: Sophie's friend who she met at Exillium, a school for banished elves. She is known as "the girl of many floods" due to the floods she caused while mastering her Hydrokinesis. She is Tam's twin sister.
- Wylie Endal: The son of Prentice Endal, a key member of the Black Swan. He is a Flasher, which means he can sense and manipulate the colors of light.
- Mr. Forkle: The leader of the Black Swan and a father figure to Sophie. He has many secret identities.
