= Rush =

Rush(es) may refer to:

== Places ==
=== United States ===
- Rush, Colorado
- Rush, Kentucky
- Rush, New York
- Rush City, Minnesota
- Rush Creek (Kishwaukee River tributary), Illinois
- Rush Creek (Marin County, California), a stream
- Rush Creek (Mono County, California), on the eastern slope of the Sierra Nevada, running into Mono Lake
- Rush County, Indiana
- Rush County, Kansas
- Rush Historic District, a zinc mining region in the Ozark Mountains of Arkansas
  - Rush Creek mining district, the former zinc mining region in North Arkansas
- Rush Lake (disambiguation), various lakes
- Rush Street (Chicago), Illinois
- Rush Township (disambiguation), various places
- Rush Valley, Utah

=== Elsewhere ===
- Rush, County Dublin, a small seaside town in Fingal, Ireland
- Rush Glacier, Brabant Island, Antarctica
- Rush Peak, in the Karakoram range, Pakistan

== People ==
- Rush (name), a list of people with either the surname or given name
- Rush (League of Legends player) (born 1993), from South Korea
- Rush (wrestler) (born 1988), ring name of Mexican professional wrestler William Muñoz
- Rush or Georges St-Pierre (born 1981), Canadian mixed martial artist

== Arts, entertainment, and media ==
=== Fictional characters ===
- Rush, a robotic dog from the Mega Man universe
- Nicholas Rush, in the television series Stargate Universe
- William Rush, protagonist in the Time Crisis 4 video game

=== Films ===
- Rushes or dailies, the first print made of a day's filming
- Rush (1983 film), a science fiction film directed by Anthony Richmond
- Rush (1991 film), a crime film directed by Lili Fini Zanuck
- Rush (2012 film), an Indian Hindi-language thriller directed by Shamin Desai
- Rush (2013 film), about Formula 1, directed by Ron Howard
- Rush (2019 film), a Sri Lankan action thriller directed by Mahesh Munasingh
- Rush (2024 film), an Indian Telugu-language action thriller directed by Satish Poloju

=== Gaming ===
- Rush (video game series), an arcade racing series
  - L.A. Rush, the fourth installment of the Rush series
- Rush (video gaming), an attack strategy
- Kinect Rush: A Disney•Pixar Adventure, a game for Windows 10 and Xbox by Pixar

=== Music ===
==== Albums ====
- Rush (Rush album), a 1974 debut album by the band of same name
- Rush (Anna Abreu album), 2011
- Rush (Bel Canto album), 1998
- Rush (Darude album), a 2003 trance album
- Rush (Dean Geyer album), a 2007 pop album
- Rush (EP), by Monsta X, 2015
- Rushes (album), a 1998 ambient electronic album by The Fireman
- Rush (1991 soundtrack), the soundtrack for the 1991 film, written by Eric Clapton
- Rush (2013 soundtrack), from the film of the same name, written by Hans Zimmer
- Rush!, 2023, by Måneskin

==== Songs ====
- "Rush" (Aly & AJ song), a 2005 pop song
- "Rush" (Ayra Starr song), 2022
- "Rush" (Big Audio Dynamite II song), a 1991 alternative dance song
- "Rush" (Lewis Capaldi song), 2018
- "Rush" (The Pillows song), a 1999 Japanese-rock song
- "Rush" (Poisonblack song), a 2006 goth-rock song
- "Rush" (Troye Sivan song), a 2023 dance-pop song
- "Rush" (William Singe song), 2017
- "Rush", 2025, by &Team on Back to Life
- "Rush", 1993, by Depeche Mode on Songs of Faith and Devotion
- "Rush", 2005, by MYMP on Beyond Acoustic
- "Rush", 2022, by Raveena from Asha's Awakening
- "Rush", 2005, by Rihanna from Music of the Sun
- "Rush", 2003, by S Club 8, B-side of the single "Fool No More"
- "Rush", 2024, by Twice from the EP With You-th
- "Rush", 2006, by Uverworld from Timeless
- "The Rush", 1991, by Luther Vandross
- "Rushes" (song), Darius Danesh's second single from his debut album Dive In
- "Rush Rush" (Debbie Harry song), 1983
- "Rush Rush" (Paula Abdul song), 1991

==== Performers ====
- Rush (band), a Canadian progressive rock band

=== Television ===
- Rush (1974 TV series), a 1974 Australian historical drama
- Rush (2008 TV series), a 2008 Australian police drama
- Rush (2023 TV series), an Australian travel adventure series
- Rush TV (TV series), a 2009 Australian music and fashion show
- Rush (Kenyan TV series), a 2014 Kenyan sitcom-soap opera
- Rush (American TV series), a 2014 American medical drama
- "Rush" (The X-Files), an episode of The X-Files
- Rush (TV channel), a New Zealand TV channel
- 9Rush, an Australian TV channel

== Education ==
- Rush University, Chicago, Illinois
  - Rush Medical College, its medical school

== Plants ==
- Rushes, grass-like plants in the Juncaceae family
- Sweet rush, Acorus calamus, an aromatic grass-like plant unrelated to the Juncaceae
- List of plants known as rush

== Ships ==
- USCGC Rush (WHEC-723), a US Coast Guard high endurance cutter
- USRC Rush, four revenue cutters of the US Revenue Marine (1790–1894) and US Revenue Cutter Service (1894–1915)
- USS Rush, the name of two US Navy ships

== Sports ==
- Rush (Australian rules football), a tactic in Australian rules football
- Rush (gridiron football), a tactic in American football
- Rush, in croquet, a roquet whose aim is to move the target ball a significant distance
- Chicago Rush, an Arena Football League team
- Denver Rush, an American women's gridiron football team
- Rapid City Rush, a hockey team
- Saskatchewan Rush, a National Lacrosse League team

== Other uses ==
- Gold rush, a fervor which arises when new unclaimed deposits of gold ore are discovered
- Rush (psychology), an acute transcendent state of euphoria
- Rush (Thorpe Park), a giant swing ride at Thorpe Park in Chertsey, Surrey, England
- Rush week, a period for joining many fraternities and sororities
- Rushes (company), a post-production and visual effects company based in London
- Toyota Rush, a version of the Daihatsu Terios mini sport utility vehicle marketed in Japan, Indonesia, Malaysia and Latin America
- Rush Enterprises, American commercial vehicle dealer

== See also ==
- No Rush (disambiguation)
- Rash (disambiguation)
- Rusch, surname
