= October 10 =

October 10 this year in various calendars
- Saturday, 10 October 2026
Akan	Nkyimemene
Armenian	22 Sahmi 1476
Aztec	Izcalli 8, 1 Cipactli
Babylonian	27 Ululu, 2337 SE
Balinese pawukon	Luang, Pepet, Kajeng, Jaya, Keliwon, Urukung, Saniscara of Wayang, Guru, Erangan, Raja
Bengali	25 Ashshin, BS 1433
Chinese	Yin Fire Snake・Willow Mansion; Fire Horse Year, Month 9, Day 1 (Hanlu, 13 days until Shuangjiang)
Common Era	10 October 2026 CE
Coptic	30 Thout, AM 1743
Egyptian	27 Mechir, 2775 NE
Ethiopian	30 Maskaram, 2019 Amätä Məhrät
French Republican	Décade II, Octidi de Vendémiaire de l'Année 235 de la République
Gregorian	10 October, AD 2026
Hebrew	29 Tishrei, AM 5787
Hindu	Hasta・Brahman; Solar: 24 Āśvina, 1948 SE; Lunisolar: Amāvasyā, Kṛishna pakṣa of Bhādrapada, 2083 VE; Rāudra・5127 KY・1,872,858
Icelandic	Laugardagur, 17 Haustmánuður 2026
Islamic	27 Rabi' al-thani, AH 1448 (using tabular method)
ISO week date	2026-W41-6
Japanese	30 Hazuki, Reiwa 8 (Kanro, 13 days until Sōkō)
Julian	27 September, AD 2026 (AM 7534)
Julian day	2461324
Korean	30 Dakdal, 4359 DE
Maya	13.0.14.0.1; 14 Yax, 1 Imix
Roman	ante diem V Kalendas Octobres, MMDCCLXXIX AUC
Solar Hijri	18 Mehr, SH 1405
Tibetan	30 khrums, me pho rta 2153 or 1772 or 1000

<<	October					>>
Su	Mo	Tu	We	Th	Fr	Sa
				1	2	3
4	5	6	7	8	9	10
11	12	13	14	15	16	17
18	19	20	21	22	23	24
25	26	27	28	29	30	31
2026

October 10 in recent years
2026 (Saturday)
2025 (Friday)
2024 (Thursday)
2023 (Tuesday)
2022 (Monday)
2021 (Sunday)
2020 (Saturday)
2019 (Thursday)
2018 (Wednesday)
2017 (Tuesday)

October 10 is the 283rd day of the year (284th in leap years) in the Gregorian calendar; 82 days remain until the end of the year.

== Events ==
=== Pre-1600 ===
- 19 – The Roman general Germanicus dies near Antioch. He was convinced that the mysterious illness that ended in his death was a result of poisoning by the Syrian governor Gnaeus Calpurnius Piso, whom he had ordered to leave the province.
- 415 – The second church structure of Hagia Sophia was inaugurated.
- 680 – The Battle of Karbala marks the martyrdom of Husayn ibn Ali.
- 732 – Charles Martel's forces defeat an Umayyad army near Tours, France.
- 1471 – Sten Sture the Elder, the Regent of Sweden, with the help of farmers and miners, repels an attack by King Christian I of Denmark.
- 1492 – The crew of Christopher Columbus's ship, the Santa Maria, attempt a mutiny.
- 1507 – The Kingdom of Hormuz recognises the sovereignty of the Portuguese king following a battle with the forces of Afonso de Albuquerque.
- 1575 – Roman Catholic forces under Henri I, Duke of Guise, defeat the Protestants, capturing Philippe de Mornay among others.
- 1580 – Over 600 Papal troops land in Ireland to support the Second Desmond Rebellion.

=== 1601–1900 ===
- 1760 – In a treaty with the Dutch colonial authorities, the Ndyuka people of Suriname – descended from escaped slaves – gain territorial autonomy.
- 1780 – The Great Hurricane of 1780 kills 20,000–30,000 in the Caribbean.
- 1814 – War of 1812: The United States Revenue Marine attempts to defend the cutter Eagle from the Royal Navy.
- 1845 – In Annapolis, Maryland, the Naval School (later the United States Naval Academy) opens with 50 students.
- 1846 – Triton, the largest moon of the planet Neptune, is discovered by English astronomer William Lassell.
- 1868 – The Ten Years' War begins against Spanish rule in Cuba.

=== 1901–present ===
- 1903 – The Women's Social and Political Union is founded in support of the enfranchisement of British women.
- 1911 – The day after a bomb explodes prematurely, the Wuchang Uprising begins against the Chinese monarchy.
- 1913 – U.S. President Woodrow Wilson triggers the explosion of the Gamboa Dike, completing major construction on the Panama Canal.
- 1918 – RMS Leinster is torpedoed and sunk by UB-123, killing 564, the largest loss of life on the Irish Sea.
- 1920 – The Carinthian plebiscite determines that the larger part of the Duchy of Carinthia should remain part of Austria.
- 1928 – Chiang Kai-shek becomes Chairman of the Republic of China.
- 1933 – A United Airlines Boeing 247 is destroyed by sabotage, the first such proven case in the history of commercial aviation.
- 1935 – In Greece, a coup d'état ends the Second Hellenic Republic.
- 1938 – Abiding by the Munich Agreement, Czechoslovakia completes its withdrawal from the Sudetenland.
- 1945 – The Double Tenth Agreement is signed by the Communist Party and the Kuomintang about the future of China.
- 1954 – The Minister of Foreign Affairs of the Sultanate of Muscat, Neil Innes, sends a signal to the Sultanate's forces, accompanied with oil explorers, to penetrate Fahud, marking the beginning of Jebel Akhdar War.
- 1957 – U.S. President Dwight D. Eisenhower apologizes to Ghanaian finance minister Komla Agbeli Gbedemah after he is refused service in a Delaware restaurant.
- 1957 – The Windscale fire results in Britain's worst nuclear accident.
- 1963 – France cedes control of the Bizerte naval base to Tunisia.
- 1963 – The Partial Nuclear Test Ban Treaty comes into effect.
- 1964 – The Tokyo Summer Olympics opening ceremony is the first to be relayed live by satellites.
- 1967 – The Outer Space Treaty comes into force.
- 1970 – Fiji becomes independent.
- 1970 – Canada's October Crisis escalates when Quebec Vice Premier Pierre Laporte is kidnapped by members of the Front de libération du Québec.
- 1971 – Aeroflot Flight 773 is destroyed by a bomb over Moscow Oblast, killing 25.
- 1973 – U.S. Vice President Spiro Agnew resigns after being charged with evasion of federal income tax.
- 1975 – Papua New Guinea joins the United Nations.
- 1979 – The Olkiluoto Nuclear Power Plant began operations in Eurajoki, Satakunta, Finland.
- 1980 – The 7.1 M_{w} El Asnam earthquake shakes northern Algeria, killing 2,633 and injuring 8,369.
- 1980 – The Farabundo Martí National Liberation Front is founded in El Salvador.
- 1985 – US Navy aircraft intercept an Egyptian airliner carrying the perpetrators of the Achille Lauro hijacking, and force it to land in Italy.
- 1986 – A 5.7 M_{w} San Salvador earthquake shakes El Salvador, killing 1,500.
- 1997 – Austral Líneas Aéreas Flight 2553 crashes and explodes in Uruguay, killing 74.
- 1998 – A Lignes Aériennes Congolaises jetliner is shot down by rebels in Kindu, Democratic Republic of the Congo, killing 41 people.
- 2002 – Iraq War: The United States Congress approves the Authorization for Use of Military Force Against Iraq Resolution of 2002.
- 2007 – Sheikh Muszaphar Shukor becomes the first Malaysian in space on board Soyuz TMA-11.
- 2009 – Armenia and Turkey sign the Zurich Protocols, intended to normalize relations. However, they are never ratified by either side.
- 2010 – The Netherlands Antilles are dissolved as a country.
- 2015 – Twin bomb blasts in the Turkish capital Ankara kill 109 and injure 500+.
- 2018 – Hurricane Michael makes landfall in the Florida Panhandle as a catastrophic Category 5 hurricane. It kills 57 people in the United States, 45 in Florida, and causes an estimated $25.1 billion in damage.
- 2018 – The National Fire and Rescue Administration is founded, replacing the China Fire Services and the People's Armed Police Forestry Corps as China's primary firefighting agency.
- 2022 – Ben S. Bernanke, Douglas W. Diamond and Philip H. Dybvig are jointly awarded the Nobel Memorial Prize in Economic Sciences.

== Births ==
=== Pre-1600 ===
- AD 19 – Tiberius Gemellus, Roman son of Drusus Julius Caesar and Livilla; adoptive son of the Emperor Caligula (died 38)
- 786 – Saga, emperor of Japan (died 842)
- 867 – Li Siyuan, Chinese emperor (died 933)
- 1332 – King Charles II of Navarre (died 1387)
- 1344 – Mary of Waltham, duchess of Brittany (died 1361)
- 1355 – Zhu Biao, Chinese prince (died 1392)
- 1421 – John Paston, English politician (died 1466)
- 1486 – Charles III of Savoy (died 1553)
- 1554 – Arnold III of Bentheim-Steinfurt-Tecklenburg-Limburg and Lord of Rheda (died 1606)
- 1560 – Jacobus Arminius, Dutch theologian (died 1609)
- 1567 – Catalina Micaela of Spain, Infanta of the House of Habsburg (died 1597)
- 1584 – Philip Herbert, 4th Earl of Pembroke (died 1649)
- 1599 – Étienne Moulinié, French composer and director (died 1676)

=== 1601–1900 ===
- 1629 – Richard Towneley, English mathematician and astronomer (died 1707)
- 1646 – Françoise-Marguerite de Sévigné, French noblewoman (died 1705)
- 1656 – Nicolas de Largillière, French painter and academic (died 1746)
- 1669 – Johann Nicolaus Bach, German organist and composer (died 1753)
- 1678 – John Campbell, 2nd Duke of Argyll, Scottish general and politician, Lord High Commissioner to the Parliament of Scotland (died 1743)
- 1684 – Jean-Antoine Watteau, French painter (died 1721)
- 1700 – Lambert-Sigisbert Adam, French sculptor and illustrator (died 1759)
- 1731 – Henry Cavendish, French-English chemist, physicist, and philosopher (died 1810)
- 1738 – Benjamin West, American painter (died 1820)
- 1770 – Adam Johann von Krusenstern Imperial Russian Admiral and explorer (died 1846)
- 1780 – John Abercrombie, Scottish physician and philosopher (died 1844)
- 1794 – William Whiting Boardman, American judge and politician (died 1871)
- 1810 – Alfred Kennerley, English-Australian politician, 10th Premier of Tasmania (died 1897)
- 1813 – Giuseppe Verdi, Italian composer and philanthropist (died 1901)
- 1819 – Heinrich Joseph Dominicus Denzinger, German theologian and author (died 1883)
- 1825 – Paul Kruger, South African soldier and politician, 5th President of the South African Republic (died 1904)
- 1828 – Samuel J. Randall, American captain, lawyer and politician, 33rd Speaker of the United States House of Representatives (died 1890)
- 1830 – Isabella II of Spain (died 1904)
- 1834 – Aleksis Kivi, Finnish author and playwright (died 1872)
- 1837 – Robert Gould Shaw, American colonel (died 1863)
- 1842 – Emily Dobson, Australian philanthropist (died 1934)
- 1858 – Maurice Prendergast, American painter and academic (died 1924)
- 1861 – Fridtjof Nansen, Norwegian explorer, scientist, and humanitarian, Nobel Prize laureate (died 1930)
- 1863 – Louis Cyr, French Canadian strongman (died 1912)
- 1864 – T. Frank Appleby, American businessman and politician (died 1924)
- 1870 – Louise Mack, Australian journalist, author, and poet (died 1935)
- 1872 – Dionysios Kasdaglis, Egyptian-Greek tennis player (died 1931)
- 1877 – William Morris, 1st Viscount Nuffield, English businessman and philanthropist, founded Morris Motors (died 1963)
- 1884 – Nikolai Klyuev, Russian poet and author (died 1937)
- 1884 – Ida Wüst, German actress and screenwriter (died 1958)
- 1885 – Walter Anderson, Belarusian-German ethnologist and academic (died 1962)
- 1885 – Jean Peyrière, French actor (died 1965)
- 1889 – Han van Meegeren, Dutch painter and forger (died 1947)
- 1895 – Alfred Neuland, Estonian weightlifter (died 1966)
- 1895 – Fridolf Rhudin, Swedish actor (died 1935)
- 1895 – Wolfram Freiherr von Richthofen, German field marshal (died 1945)
- 1898 – Lilly Daché, French-American fashion designer (died 1989)
- 1900 – Helen Hayes, American actress (died 1993)

=== 1901–present ===
- 1901 – Alberto Giacometti, Swiss sculptor and painter (died 1966)
- 1902 – K. Shivaram Karanth, Indian journalist, author, and activist (died 1997)
- 1903 – Prince Charles, Count of Flanders (died 1983)
- 1903 – Vernon Duke, Russian-American composer and songwriter (died 1969)
- 1903 – Bei Shizhang, Chinese biologist and academic (died 2009)
- 1905 – Aksella Luts, Estonian actress, screenwriter, dancer, and choreographer (died 2005)
- 1906 – Paul Creston, American composer and educator (died 1985)
- 1906 – Fei Mu, Chinese director and screenwriter (died 1951)
- 1906 – R. K. Narayan, Indian author (died 2001)
- 1908 – Johnny Green, American conductor and composer (died 1989)
- 1908 – Mercè Rodoreda, Catalan author and poet (died 1983)
- 1909 – Robert F. Boyle, American production designer and art director (died 2010)
- 1910 – Price Daniel, American politician, 38th Governor of Texas (died 1988)
- 1910 – Harold LeVander, American politician, 32nd Governor of Minnesota (died 1992)
- 1910 – Julius Shulman, American photographer and environmentalist (died 2009)
- 1911 – Clare Hollingworth, English journalist and author (died 2017)
- 1912 – Ram Vilas Sharma, Indian poet and critic (died 2000)
- 1913 – Claude Simon, Malagasy-French novelist and critic, Nobel Prize laureate (died 2005)
- 1914 – Tommy Fine, American baseball player and businessman (died 2005)
- 1914 – Ivory Joe Hunter, American singer-songwriter and pianist (died 1974)
- 1915 – Harry Edison, American trumpet player and composer (died 1999)
- 1917 – Thelonious Monk, American pianist and composer (died 1982)
- 1919 – Willard Estey, Canadian academic and jurist (died 2002)
- 1919 – Gerry Gomez, Trinidadian cricketer, manager, and umpire (died 1996)
- 1919 – Kim Ki-young, South Korean director, screenwriter, producer, and editor (died 1997)
- 1919 – William Kruskal, American mathematician and statistician (died 2005)
- 1919 – Edgar Laprade, Canadian ice hockey player (died 2014)
- 1920 – Gail Halvorsen, American air force pilot known as the "Berlin Candy Bomber" (died 2022)
- 1921 – James Clavell, English and American writer, filmmaker and a British Army officer during WW II (died 1994)
- 1922 – Merv Pregulman, American football player, businessman, and philanthropist (died 2012)
- 1923 – Louis Gottlieb, American singer and bass player (died 1996)
- 1923 – Nicholas Parsons, English actor and game show host (died 2020)
- 1923 – Murray Walker, English journalist and sportscaster (died 2021)
- 1924 – James Clavell, Australian-American director, producer, screenwriter, and author (died 1994)
- 1924 – Ludmilla Tchérina, French actress, ballerina, and choreographer (died 2004)
- 1924 – Ed Wood, American actor, director, producer, screenwriter (died 1978)
- 1926 – Oscar Brown, American singer-songwriter, playwright, and actor (died 2005)
- 1926 – Richard Jaeckel, American actor (died 1997)
- 1927 – Dana Elcar, American actor and director (died 2005)
- 1927 – Jon Locke, American actor (died 2013)
- 1927 – Thomas Wilson, American-Scottish composer and educator (died 2001)
- 1928 – Leyla Gencer, Turkish soprano (died 2008)
- 1928 – Sheila Walsh, English author (died 2009)
- 1929 – Ayten Alpman, Turkish singer (died 2012)
- 1929 – Herb Levinson, American actor (died 2012)
- 1929 – Bernard Mayes, English-American journalist and academic (died 2014)
- 1930 – Eugenio Castellotti, Italian race car driver (died 1957)
- 1930 – Yves Chauvin, French chemist and academic, Nobel Prize laureate (died 2015)
- 1930 – Harold Pinter, English playwright, screenwriter, director Nobel Prize laureate (died 2008)
- 1930 – Adlai Stevenson III, American lawyer and politician (died 2021)
- 1932 – Harry Smith, English footballer (died 2016)
- 1933 – Salome Bey, American-Canadian jazz singer and music producer (died 2020)
- 1933 – Jay Sebring, American hair stylist and businessman (died 1969)
- 1935 – Khalil al-Wazir, Palestinian commander, founded Fatah (died 1988)
- 1935 – André Bureau, Canadian lawyer and businessman (died 2019)
- 1935 – Judith Chalmers, English television host and actress (died 2026)
- 1936 – Gerhard Ertl, German physicist and chemist, Nobel Prize laureate
- 1937 – Bruce Devlin, Australian golfer and sportscaster
- 1937 – Peter Underwood, Australian lawyer and politician, 27th Governor of Tasmania (died 2014)
- 1938 – Oleg Gordievsky, Russian intelligence officer and author (died 2025)
- 1938 – Leroy Hood, American biologist and academic
- 1938 – Daidō Moriyama, Japanese photographer
- 1938 – Lily Tuck, American novelist and short story writer
- 1940 – Winston Churchill, English journalist and politician (died 2010)
- 1941 – Peter Coyote, American actor, director, and screenwriter
- 1941 – Ken Saro-Wiwa, Nigerian author and activist (died 1995)
- 1942 – Janis Hansen, American singer and author (died 2017)
- 1942 – Radu Vasile, Romanian historian and politician, 57th Prime Minister of Romania (died 2013)
- 1943 – Frederick Barthelme, American novelist and short story writer
- 1944 – Eurig Wyn, Welsh politician (died 2019)
- 1945 – Christopher Hill, English bishop
- 1945 – Vanburn Holder, Barbadian cricketer
- 1945 – Headman Shabalala, South African bass singer (died 1991)
- 1946 – Charles Dance, English actor, director, and screenwriter
- 1946 – Naoto Kan, Japanese lawyer and politician, 61st Prime Minister of Japan
- 1946 – Peter Mahovlich, Canadian ice hockey player and coach
- 1946 – Anne Mather, English author and screenwriter
- 1946 – John Prine, American singer-songwriter and guitarist (died 2020)
- 1946 – Raymond Tallis, English physician, philosopher, author, and academic
- 1946 – Chris Tarrant, English radio and television host
- 1946 – Ben Vereen, American actor, singer, and dancer
- 1946 – Willard White, Jamaican-English actor and singer
- 1947 – Gary Beach, American actor and singer (died 2018)
- 1947 – Giant Haystacks, English wrestler (died 1998)
- 1948 – Sue Campbell, Baroness Campbell of Loughborough, English academic and businesswoman
- 1948 – Cyril Neville, American R&B percussionist and singer
- 1948 – Séverine, French singer and actress
- 1949 – Warren Burt, American-Australian composer
- 1949 – Lance Cairns, New Zealand cricketer
- 1949 – Jessica Harper, American actress
- 1949 – Wang Wanxing, Chinese activist
- 1950 – Charlie George, English footballer
- 1950 – Nora Roberts, American author
- 1951 – Epeli Ganilau, Fijian general and politician, 16th Minister for Fijian Affairs (died 2023)
- 1952 – Bob Nystrom, Swedish ice hockey player
- 1952 – Dela Smith, English educator
- 1953 – Fiona Rae, Scottish painter
- 1953 – Midge Ure, Scottish singer-songwriter, guitarist, and producer
- 1953 – Aleksander Veingold, Estonian chess player and coach
- 1953 – Gus Williams, American basketball player
- 1954 – Václav Patejdl, Slovak musician (died 2023)
- 1954 – Rekha, Indian actress
- 1954 – David Lee Roth, American singer-songwriter and producer
- 1954 – Fernando Santos, Portuguese footballer and manager
- 1956 – Amanda Burton, Northern Irish actress and producer
- 1956 – David Hempleman-Adams, English businessman and adventurer
- 1956 – Taur Matan Ruak, East Timorese politician, 3rd President of East Timor
- 1957 – Rumiko Takahashi, Japanese author and illustrator
- 1958 – Tanya Tucker, American singer-songwriter and guitarist
- 1959 – Michael Cobley, English-Scottish author
- 1959 – Kirsty MacColl, English singer-songwriter (died 2000)
- 1959 – Arif Peçenek, Turkish football player and manager (died 2013)
- 1959 – Bill Rammell, English academic and politician, Minister of State for the Armed Forces
- 1959 – Julia Sweeney, American actress, comedian, producer, and screenwriter
- 1959 – Bradley Whitford, American actor and producer
- 1960 – Ron Flockhart, Canadian ice hockey player
- 1960 – Russell Slade, English football manager
- 1960 – Simon Townshend, English singer-songwriter, guitarist, and producer
- 1961 – Henrik Jørgensen, Danish runner (died 2019)
- 1961 – Martin Kemp, English singer-songwriter and bass player
- 1961 – Crystal Waters, American singer-songwriter, musician and producer
- 1962 – Thomas Rusch, German photographer
- 1963 – Jolanda de Rover, Dutch swimmer
- 1963 – Anita Mui, Hong Kong singer and actress (died 2003)
- 1963 – Daniel Pearl, American-Israeli journalist (died 2002)
- 1963 – Vegard Ulvang, Norwegian skier
- 1964 – Sarah Lancashire, English actress and director
- 1965 – Toshi, Japanese singer-songwriter and producer
- 1965 – Chris Penn, American actor (died 2006)
- 1966 – Tony Adams, English footballer and manager
- 1966 – Bai Ling, Chinese-American model and actress
- 1967 – Michael Giacchino, American composer
- 1967 – Jonathan Littell, American-French author and humanitarian
- 1967 – Mike Malinin, American drummer and producer
- 1967 – Gavin Newsom, American businessman and politician, 40th and current Governor of California
- 1967 – Jacek Zieliński, Polish footballer and coach
- 1968 – Bart Brentjens, Dutch cyclist
- 1968 – Feridun Düzağaç, Turkish singer-songwriter
- 1968 – Chris Ofili, British painter
- 1969 – Manu Bennett, New Zealand-Australian actor
- 1969 – Dilsa Demirbag Sten, Swedish journalist and author
- 1969 – Francis Escudero, Filipino lawyer and politician
- 1969 – Brett Favre, American football player
- 1969 – Wendi McLendon-Covey, American actress
- 1970 – Silke Kraushaar-Pielach, German sled racer
- 1970 – Matthew Pinsent, English rower and sportscaster
- 1971 – Graham Alexander, English-Scottish footballer and manager
- 1971 – Evgeny Kissin, Russian pianist
- 1972 – Jun Lana, Filipino director, producer, playwright, and screenwriter
- 1972 – Alexei Zhitnik, Ukrainian-Russian ice hockey player
- 1973 – Mario Lopez, American actor, television personality, and producer
- 1973 – Zach Thornton, American soccer player and coach
- 1974 – Asi Cohen, Israeli actor and screenwriter
- 1974 – Oded Kattash, Israeli basketball player and coach
- 1974 – Julio Ricardo Cruz, Argentinian footballer
- 1974 – Dale Earnhardt Jr., American race car driver and actor
- 1974 – Lucy Powell, English politician
- 1974 – Chris Pronger, Canadian ice hockey player
- 1975 – Ihsahn, Norwegian singer-songwriter, guitarist, and producer
- 1975 – Ramón Morales, Mexican footballer and manager
- 1975 – Plácido Polanco, Dominican-American baseball player
- 1976 – Bob Burnquist, Brazilian-American skateboarder
- 1976 – Pat Burrell, American baseball player
- 1976 – Shane Doan, Canadian ice hockey player
- 1978 – Naomi Levari, Israeli film producer and director
- 1978 – Jodi Lyn O'Keefe, American model and actress
- 1979 – Kangta, South Korean singer-songwriter, producer, and actor
- 1979 – Nicolás Massú, Chilean tennis player
- 1979 – Mýa, American singer-songwriter, producer, dancer, and actress
- 1980 – Julie Pomagalski, French snowboarder (died 2021)
- 1981 – Una Healy, Irish singer-songwriter, member of The Saturdays
- 1981 – Gavin Shuker, English lawyer and politician
- 1981 – Laura Tobin, English weather reporter
- 1982 – Yasser Al-Qahtani, Saudi Arabian footballer
- 1982 – David Cal, Spanish sprint canoeist
- 1982 – Tony Khan, American sports executive
- 1982 – Dan Stevens, English actor
- 1984 – Stephanie Cheng, Hong Kong singer
- 1984 – Jean-Baptiste Grange, French skier
- 1984 – Ryan Hollins, American basketball player and commentator
- 1984 – Chiaki Kuriyama, Japanese actress and singer
- 1984 – Paul Posluszny, American football player
- 1984 – Troy Tulowitzki, American baseball player
- 1985 – Marina Diamandis, Welsh singer-songwriter and pianist
- 1985 – Bronson Harrison, New Zealand rugby league player
- 1985 – Rostislav Olesz, Czech ice hockey player
- 1986 – Nathan Jawai, Australian basketball player
- 1986 – Andrew McCutchen, American baseball player
- 1986 – Ellen Andrea Wang, Norwegian bassist and composer
- 1987 – Ryan Mathews, American football player
- 1988 – Shaun Fensom, Australian rugby league player
- 1988 – Brown Ideye, Nigerian footballer
- 1988 – Rose McIver, New Zealand actress
- 1989 – Jeurys Familia, Dominican baseball player
- 1989 – Emer Kenny, English actress and screenwriter
- 1990 – Shelby Miller, American baseball player
- 1990 – Geno Smith, American football player
- 1990 – Kolten Wong, American baseball player
- 1991 – Michael Carter-Williams, American basketball player
- 1991 – Gabriella Cilmi, Australian singer-songwriter and producer
- 1991 – Lali Espósito, Argentinian actress and singer
- 1991 – Mariana Pajón, Colombian cyclist
- 1991 – Xherdan Shaqiri, Swiss footballer
- 1992 – Anthony Brown, American basketball player
- 1993 – Lourdes Gurriel Jr., Cuban baseball player
- 1993 – Jayden Stockley, English footballer
- 1994 – Bae Suzy, South Korean singer, actress and model
- 1994 – Mike Tobey, American-Slovenian basketball player
- 1994 – Marquez Valdes-Scantling, American football player
- 1995 – Brenko Lee, Australian-Tongan rugby league player
- 1995 – Courtland Sutton, American football player
- 1996 – Sami Niku, Finnish ice hockey player
- 2002 – Josh Giddey, Australian basketball player

== Deaths ==
=== Pre-1600 ===
- AD 19 – Germanicus, Roman general (born 15 BC)
- 644 – Paulinus of York, English bishop and missionary
- 680 – Abbas ibn Ali, son of Imam Ali
- 680 – Ali al-Akbar ibn Husayn, son of Al-Husayn
- 680 – Habib ibn Madhahir
- 680 – Husayn ibn Ali, third Shia Imam and grandson of Muhammad (born 626)
- 827 – Pope Valentine (born 800)
- 937 – Wang Lingmou, chancellor of Wu
- 1149 – Al-Hafiz, Fatimid imam-caliph (born 1074/77)
- 1174 – Adela of Ponthieu, Countess of Surrey
- 1213 – Frederick II, Duke of Lorraine
- 1308 – Patrick Dunbar, 8th Earl of Dunbar
- 1359 – Hugh IV of Cyprus (born 1295)
- 1503 – Peter II, Duke of Bourbon (born 1438)
- 1581 – Bayinnaung, Burmese king (born 1516)

=== 1601–1900 ===
- 1659 – Abel Tasman, Dutch merchant and explorer (born 1603)
- 1691 – Isaac de Benserade, French author and poet (born 1613)
- 1708 – David Gregory, Scottish mathematician and astronomer (born 1659)
- 1714 – Pierre Le Pesant, sieur de Boisguilbert, French economist and academic (born 1646)
- 1720 – Antoine Coysevox, French sculptor (born 1640)
- 1723 – William Cowper, 1st Earl Cowper, English lawyer and politician, Lord High Chancellor of Great Britain (born 1665)
- 1725 – Philippe de Rigaud Vaudreuil, French politician, Governor of New France (born 1643)
- 1747 – John Potter, English archbishop and academic (born 1674)
- 1759 – Granville Elliott, English general (born 1713)
- 1765 – Lionel Sackville, 1st Duke of Dorset, English politician, Lord Lieutenant of Ireland (born 1688)
- 1795 – Francesco Antonio Zaccaria, Italian historian and theologian (born 1714)
- 1800 – Gabriel Prosser, American rebel leader (born 1776)
- 1806 – Prince Louis Ferdinand of Prussia (born 1772)
- 1827 – Ugo Foscolo, Italian author and poet (born 1778)
- 1837 – Charles Fourier, French philosopher and academic (born 1772)
- 1857 – George Washington Parke Custis, American author and playwright (born 1781)
- 1872 – William H. Seward, American lawyer and politician, 24th United States Secretary of State (born 1801)
- 1875 – Aleksey Konstantinovich Tolstoy, Russian author, poet, and playwright (born 1817)
- 1876 – Charles Joseph Sainte-Claire Deville, French geologist and meteorologist (born 1814)
- 1893 – Lip Pike, American baseball player and manager (born 1845)
- 1894 – William Robinson (Canadian architect), Canadian architect and land surveyor (b. 1812)

=== 1901–present ===
- 1901 – Lorenzo Snow, American religious leader, 5th President of The Church of Jesus Christ of Latter-day Saints (born 1814)
- 1913 – Adolphus Busch, German-American brewer and businessman, co-founded Anheuser-Busch (born 1839)
- 1913 – Katsura Tarō, Japanese general and politician, 6th Prime Minister of Japan (born 1848)
- 1914 – Carol I of Romania (born 1839)
- 1918 – Henry Dobson, Australian politician, 17th Premier of Tasmania (born 1841)
- 1922 – Andreas Karkavitsas, Greek physician and author (born 1866)
- 1923 – Andrés Avelino Cáceres, Peruvian general, President of Peru (born 1836)
- 1927 – August Kitzberg, Estonian author and playwright (born 1855)
- 1927 – Gustave Whitehead, German-American pilot and engineer (born 1874)
- 1930 – Adolf Engler, German botanist and academic (born 1844)
- 1935 – Gustave Loiseau, French painter (born 1865)
- 1936 – Abul Kasem, Bengali politician (born 1872)
- 1940 – Berton Churchill, Canadian-American actor and singer (born 1876)
- 1942 – Arnold Majewski, Finnish military hero of Polish descent (killed in action) (born 1892)
- 1948 – Ted Horn, American race car driver (born 1910)
- 1949 – Chikuhei Nakajima, Japanese engineer, businessman, and politician, founded Nakajima Aircraft Company (born 1884)
- 1953 – Erima Harvey Northcroft, New Zealand general, lawyer, and judge (born 1884)
- 1957 – Karl Genzken, German physician and convicted war criminal (born 1885)
- 1962 – Stancho Belkovski, Bulgarian-Polish architect (born 1891)
- 1963 – Roy Cazaly, Australian footballer and coach (born 1893)
- 1963 – Édith Piaf, French singer-songwriter and actress (born 1915)
- 1964 – Eddie Cantor, American singer-songwriter, dancer, and actor (born 1892)
- 1964 – Heinrich Neuhaus, Ukrainian-Russian pianist and educator (born 1888)
- 1966 – Charlotte Cooper, English-Scottish tennis player (born 1870)
- 1966 – Louise Thuliez, French school teacher, resistance fighter during World War I and World War II, and author (born 1881)
- 1970 – Édouard Daladier, French captain and politician, 105th Prime Minister of France (born 1884)
- 1971 – John Cawte Beaglehole, New Zealand historian and scholar (born 1901)
- 1973 – Ludwig von Mises, Ukrainian-American economist and sociologist (born 1881)
- 1974 – Joseph Wulf, German-Polish historian (born 1912)
- 1976 – Silvana Armenulić, Bosnian singer and actress (born 1939)
- 1976 – Mirsada Mirjana Bajraktarević, Bosnian singer-songwriter (born 1951)
- 1977 – Angelo Muscat, Maltese-English actor (born 1930)
- 1978 – Ralph Marterie, Italian-American trumpet player and bandleader (born 1914)
- 1978 – Ralph Metcalfe, American sprinter and politician (born 1910)
- 1979 – Christopher Evans, English psychologist, computer scientist, and author (born 1931)
- 1979 – Paul Paray, French organist, composer, and conductor (born 1886)
- 1982 – Jean Effel, French painter and journalist (born 1908)
- 1983 – Ralph Richardson, English actor (born 1902)
- 1985 – Yul Brynner, Russian-American actor (born 1920)
- 1985 – Orson Welles, American actor, director, producer, and screenwriter (born 1915)
- 1986 – Gleb Wataghin, Ukrainian-Italian physicist and academic (born 1899)
- 1987 – Behice Boran, Turkish Marxist politician, author and sociologist (born 1910)
- 1990 – Tom Murton, American penologist and activist (born 1928)
- 1990 – Nikolaos Pavlopoulos, Greek sculptor and academic (born 1909)
- 1990 – Dorothy Stanley, American educator (born 1924)
- 1991 – Nickolaus Hirschl, Austrian wrestler, discus thrower, and shot putter (born 1906)
- 1997 – Michael J. S. Dewar, Indian-born American theoretical chemist, developer of the Dewar–Chatt–Duncanson model (born 1918)
- 1998 – Clark Clifford, American captain, lawyer, and politician, 9th United States Secretary of Defense (born 1906)
- 1998 – Marvin Gay Sr., American minister (born 1914)
- 1998 – Tommy Quaid, Irish hurler and manager (born 1957)
- 2000 – Sirimavo Bandaranaike, Sri Lankan lawyer and politician, 6th Prime Minister of Sri Lanka (born 1916)
- 2001 – Eddie Futch, American boxer and trainer (born 1911)
- 2001 – Vasily Mishin, Russian engineer (born 1917)
- 2003 – Eila Hiltunen, Finnish sculptor (born 1922)
- 2003 – Eugene Istomin, American pianist (born 1925)
- 2004 – Ken Caminiti, American baseball player (born 1963)
- 2004 – Christopher Reeve, American actor, producer, and activist (born 1952)
- 2004 – Arthur H. Robinson, American geographer and cartographer (born 1915)
- 2004 – Maurice Shadbolt, New Zealand author and playwright (born 1932)
- 2005 – Wayne C. Booth, American educator and critic (born 1921)
- 2005 – Milton Obote, Ugandan politician, 2nd President of Uganda (born 1925)
- 2006 – Michael John Rogers, English ornithologist and academic (born 1932)
- 2006 – Ian Scott, Canadian lawyer and politician (born 1934)
- 2008 – Kazuyoshi Miura, Japanese businessman (born 1947)
- 2009 – Stephen Gately, Irish singer-songwriter, dancer, and actor (born 1976)
- 2010 – Solomon Burke, American singer-songwriter and preacher (born 1940)
- 2010 – Joan Sutherland, Australian-Swiss soprano and actress (born 1926)
- 2011 – Jagjit Singh, Indian singer-songwriter (born 1941)
- 2012 – Sam Gibbons, American captain and politician (born 1920)
- 2012 – Alex Karras, American football player, wrestler, and actor (born 1935)
- 2012 – Piotr Lenartowicz, Polish philosopher and educator (born 1934)
- 2012 – Basil L. Plumley, American sergeant (born 1920)
- 2012 – Mark Poster, American philosopher and educator (born 1941)
- 2012 – Kyaw Zaw, Burmese commander and politician (born 1919)
- 2013 – Scott Carpenter, American commander, pilot, and astronaut (born 1925)
- 2013 – Jay Conrad Levinson, American author and educator (born 1933)
- 2013 – Sohei Miyashita, Japanese politician, Japanese Minister of Defense (born 1927)
- 2013 – Cal Smith, American singer and guitarist (born 1932)
- 2014 – Olav Dale, Norwegian saxophonist and composer (born 1958)
- 2014 – Damiana Eugenio, Filipino author and academic (born 1921)
- 2014 – Valeri Karpov, Russian ice hockey player (born 1971)
- 2014 – Lari Ketner, American football and basketball player (born 1977)
- 2014 – Pavel Landovský, Czech actor, director, and playwright (born 1936)
- 2014 – Ed Nimmervoll, Austrian-Australian journalist, historian, and author (born 1947)
- 2015 – Diepreye Alamieyeseigha, Nigerian politician, Governor of Bayelsa State (born 1952)
- 2015 – Hilla Becher, German photographer and educator (born 1934)
- 2015 – Manorama, Indian (Tamil) actress (born 1937)
- 2015 – Steve Mackay, American saxophonist and composer (born 1949)
- 2015 – Sybil Stockdale, American activist, co-founded the National League of Families (born 1924)
- 2016 – Donn Fendler, American author and speaker (born 1926)
- 2021 – Abdul Qadeer Khan, Pakistani nuclear physicist and metallurgical scientist (born 1936)
- 2022 – Mulayam Singh Yadav, Indian politician, 15th Chief Minister of Uttar Pradesh (born 1939)
- 2024 – Fleur Adcock, New Zealand poet (born 1934)
- 2024 – Ethel Kennedy, American philanthropist (born 1928)
- 2025 – John Lodge, English singer-songwriter and bassist (born 1943)

== Holidays and observances ==
- Aleksis Kivi Day, also known as the Finnish Literature Day (Finland)
- Arbor Day (Poland)
- Army Day (Sri Lanka)
- Capital Liberation Day (Vietnam)
- Christian feast day:
  - Blessed Mary Angela Truszkowska
  - Cerbonius
  - Daniele Comboni
  - Blessed Edward Detkens
  - Eulampius and Eulampia
  - Gereon and companions
  - Blessed María Catalina Irigoyen Echegaray (Maria Desposorios)
  - Paulinus of York
  - Pinytus
  - Tanca
  - Vida Dutton Scudder (Episcopal Church)
  - Viktor of Xanten
  - October 10 (Eastern Orthodox liturgics)
- Constitution Day (Sint Maarten)
- Curaçao Day, anniversary of autonomy
- Double Ten Day (The National Day of Republic of China), celebrates outbreak of the Wuchang Uprising in 1911 that led to founding of the Republic of China in 1912
- Fiji Day (Fiji)
- Independence Day (Cuba)
- Party Foundation Day (North Korea)
- World Day Against the Death Penalty
- World Mental Health Day
- World Porridge Day
