= October 10 (Eastern Orthodox liturgics) =

Day in the Eastern Orthodox liturgical calendar

Eastern Orthodox liturgical calendar
October 9	October 10	October 11
October 10 O.S. ≍ October 23 N.S. October 10 N.S ≍ September 27 O.S.

An Eastern Orthodox cross

October 10 in Eastern Orthodox liturgical calendars is a feast day and a day of commemoration of saints and martyrs. Although some Orthodox churches use the Revised Julian Calendar and others use the traditional Julian calendar, the fixed commemorations for their respective October 10 are broadly the same, no matter which calendar is used. (Note: Despite the dates being the same, the days to which they refer typically differ by 13 days. The notation Old Style or O.S. is sometimes used to indicate a date in the traditional Julian Calendar (the "Old Calendar"). The notation New Style or N.S. indicates a date in the Revised Julian calendar (the "New Calendar").)

== Saints ==
- Saint Pinytus (Gr. Πινυτός), Bishop of Knossos in Crete (c. 180) (Note: "In the island of Crete, blessed Pinytus, most noble among the bishops. He was bishop of Gnosia, and flourished under Marcus Antoninus Verus and Lucius Aurelius Commodus. He left in his writings, as in a mirror, a vivid delineation of himself.") (Note: "EUSEBIUS speaks of Pinitus, Bishop of Gnossus, in Crete, who lived at the time of Dionysius of Corinth. Dionysius wrote to Pinitus, "not to impose on the brethren, without necessity, too severe a burden in regard to purity, but to pay regard to the infirmity of the great bulk of the people." To which Pinitus, writing in reply, said that he admired and applauded Dionysius, but exhorted him, at the same time, to impart some time or other food which was stronger to his flock, and to feed them with writings abounding in more perfect doctrine, so that they might not remain constantly imbibing the mere milk of doctrine, and grow old under a discipline calculated for children. "In this epistle also, the correct views which Pinitus cherished, and his solicitude for those committed to his care, also his learning and intelligence in divine matters, appear evidently."")
- Martyr Theotecnus of Antioch (3rd-4th century) (Note: He may be the same saint commemorated on December 10, although the Greek sources state he was martyred by the sword, while the Slavic sources affirm he was drowned.)
- Martyrs Eulampius and Eulampia and 200 martyrs with them, at Nicomedia (303-311) (Note: "At Nicomedia, the holy martyrs Eulampius, and his sister, the virgin Eulampia, who, hearing that her brother was tortured for Christ, rushed through the crowd, embraced him and became his companion. Both were cast into a caldron of boiling oil, but being quite uninjured, they terminated their martyrdom by decapitation with two hundred others, who, impressed by the miracle, had believed in Christ.") (Note: Name days celebrated today include: Eulampios (Εὐλάμπιος); Eulampia (Εὐλαμπία).)
- Saint Maharsapor (or Sapor; died 421), an early Persian martyr.
- Saint Bassian of Constantinople (c. 458)
- Venerables Theophilus the Confessor and Longinus the Stylite (716)

== Pre-Schism Western saints ==
- Martyrs of the Theban Legion, along the Rhine (c. 287):

- Saints Cassius and Florentius, at Bonn; (Note: Cassius, Florentius and Companions. Martyrs under the Emperor Maximian Herculeus in Bonn in Germany.) (Note: "At Bonn, in Germany, the holy martyrs Cassius and Florentius, with many others.")
- Saints Gereon and companions, at Cologne; (Note: Gereon. A soldier martyred in Germany, either in Xanten or else in Bonn.) (Note: "At Cologne, in the persecution of Maximian, St. Gereon, martyr, with three hundred and eighteen others, who patiently bowed their necks to the sword for the true religion.")
- Saints Victor and companions, at Xanten (Germany) (Note: Victor and Companions. A group of three hundred and thirty soldiers connected with the Theban Legion in Switzerland.) (Note: "In the neighborhood of the same city, the holy martyrs Victor and his companions.")

- Saint Clarus of Nantes (Clair), Bishop of Nantes in France (3rd century)
- Saint Cerbonius, Bishop of Verona in Italy (c. 400)
- Saint Patrician, a bishop in Scotland who was driven out by heathen and spent the remainder of his life on the Isle of Man (5th century)
- Saint Cerbonius, Bishop of Populonia in Tuscany, during the Barbarian invasions (c. 580) (Note: One of the bishops in North Africa driven from their sees by the Arian Vandals. He settled at Piombino in Tuscany in Italy and was a bishop there.) (Note: "At Piombino, in Tuscany, St. Cerbonius, bishop and confessor, who, as St. Gregory relates, was renowned for miracles, both during life and after death.")
- Saint Tanca, a young girl near Troyes in France who was martyred defending her virginity (c. 637)
- Saint Paulinus of York, Archbishop of York (644) (Note: Born in Rome, he was sent to England with Sts Mellitus and Justus (601) to help St Augustine. He spent twenty-four years in Kent and in 625 was consecrated Bishop of York and sent to enlighten Northumbria, where he baptised King Edwin in York. After the King's martyrdom, he returned to Kent, where he became Bishop of Rochester.) (Note: "At York, in England, the holy bishop Paulinus, disciple of the blessed pope Gregory. Being sent thither by that pope with others to preach the Gospel, he converted king Edwin and his people to the faith of Christ.")
- Saint Aldericus (Aldric, Audri), Archbishop of Sens (841) (Note: Born in the Gâtinais in France, he became a monk at Ferrières. The Archbishop of Sens took him into his clergy and he became Archbishop himself in 828.)
- Saint Paulinus of Capua, Bishop of Capua (843) (Note: A pilgrim, perhaps from England, who stayed in Capua in Italy and was forced by the inhabitants to become their bishop. After an episcopate of eight years he reposed in Sicopolis where he had fled during the invasion of the Saracens.: See: (in Italian) Paolino di Capua. Wikipedia. (Italian Wikipedia).)
- Saint Fulk of Fontenelle, twenty-first Abbot of Fontenelle Abbey in France (845)

== Post-Schism Orthodox saints ==
- Saint Amphilochius, Bishop of Vladimir, Volhynia (1122) (see also: August 28 )
- Martyrdom of the 26 Martyrs of Zographou Monastery on Mount Athos by the Latins (1284): (see also: September 22)

- Abbot Thomas, Monks Barsanuphius, Cyril, Micah, Simon, Hilarion, Job, James, Cyprian, Sabbas, James, Martinian, Cosmas, Sergius, Paul, Menas, Ioasaph, Ioannicius, Anthony, Euthymius, Dometian, and Parthenius, and four laymen.

- Saint Dionysios the Philosopher (1611) (Note: Although he was withdrawn by the Ecumenical Patriarchate as Metropolitan of Larissa, Dionysios is revered as a saint by many Greeks, especially in Epirus. He is honored by them on October 10th, although he is not officially commemorated as a saint by the Church.)
- Blessed Andrew of Totma in Vologda, Fool-for-Christ (1673)
- Saint Innocent, Bishop of Penza (1819) (Note: See: (in Russian) Иннокентий (Смирнов). Википе́дия. (Russian Wikipedia).)
- Venerable Ambrose of Optina, Elder of Optina Monastery (1891)

=== New Martys and Confessors ===
- New Hieromartyr Theodore (Pozdeyevsky), Archbishop of Volokolamsk (1937) (Note: See: (in Russian) Феодор (Поздеевский). Википе́дия. (Russian Wikipedia).: Собором Русской православной церкви за границей в 1981 году был канонизован как священномученик и исповедник.) (see also: March 21)

== Other commemorations ==
- Synaxis of the Seven Saints of Volhynia: (Note: See: (in Russian) Собор Волынских Святых. Википе́дия. (Russian Wikipedia).)

- Saints Stephen (1094) and Amphilochius (1122), Bishops of Vladimir in Volhynia
- Saint Yaropolk-Peter, Prince of Vladimir in Volhynia (1086)
- St. Theodore (in monasticism Theodosius) of the Kiev Caves, Prince of Ostrog in Volhynia (1483)
- St. Juliana, Princess of Olshansk (c. 1540)
- St. Job of Pochaev, Abbot and Wonderworker of Pochaev (1651)
- Hieromartyr Macarius of Kanev, Archimandrite, of Obruch and Pinsk (1678)

- Zographou Icon of the Most Holy Theotokos "Of the Akathist.

== Icon gallery ==
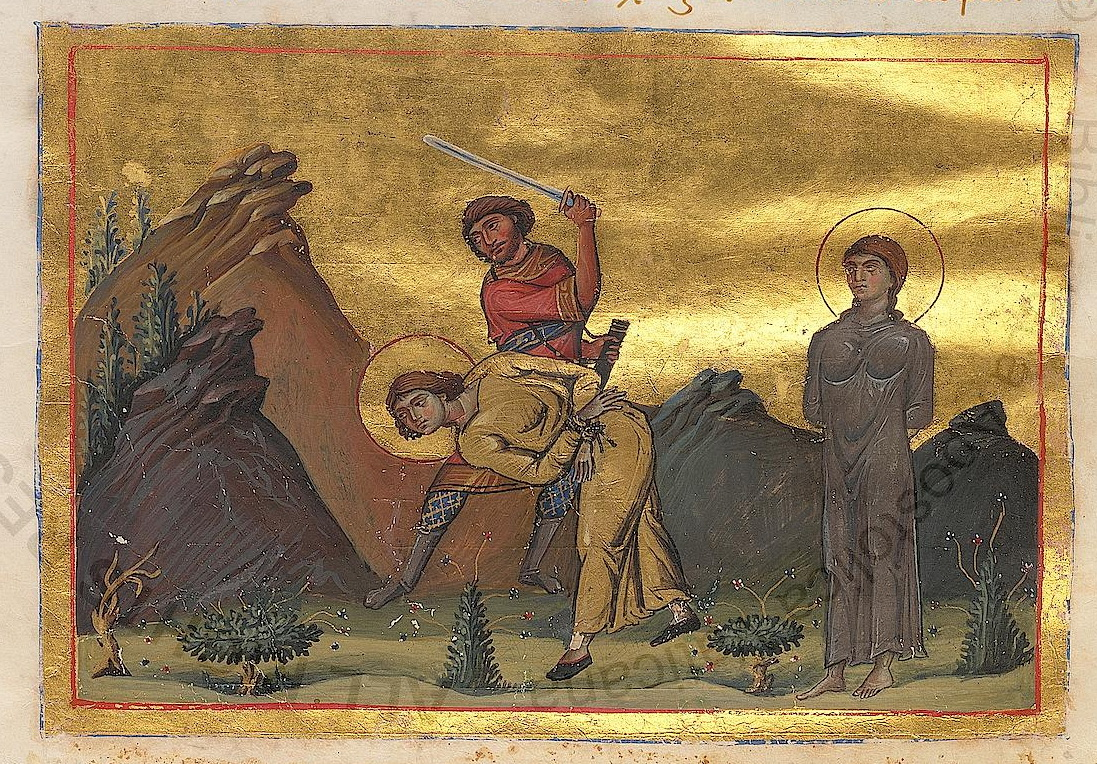
Martyrs Eulampius and Eulampia.
(Menologion of Basil II, 10th century).

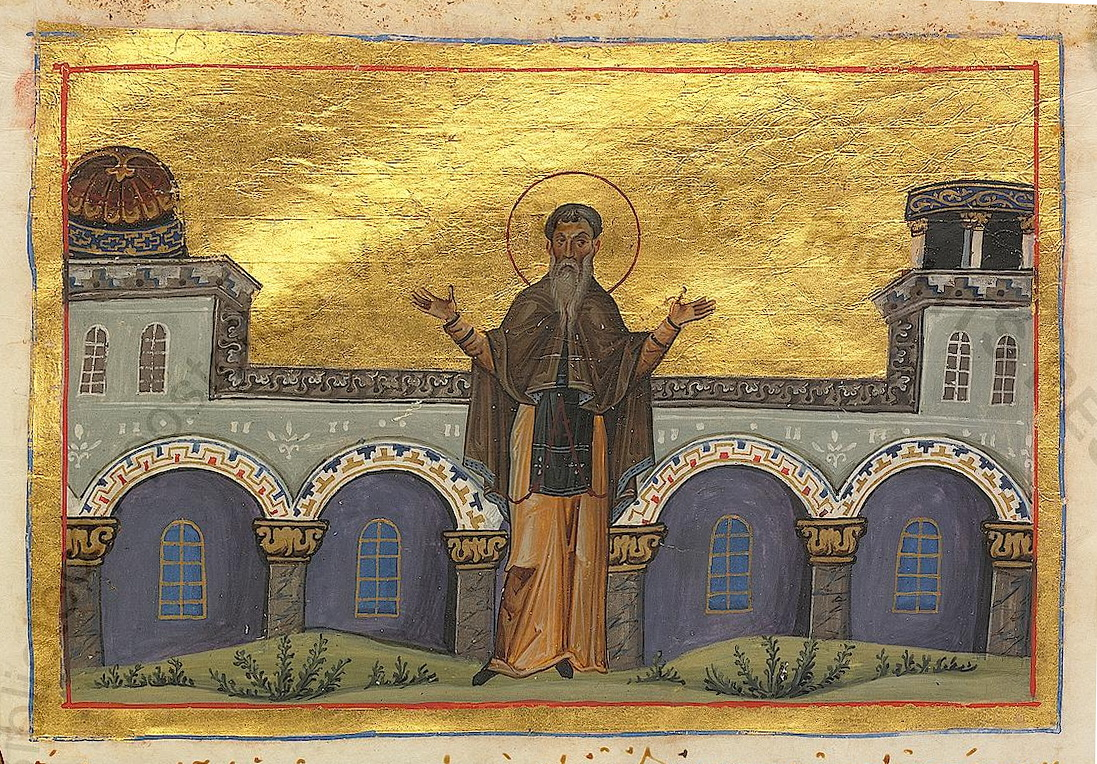
St. Bassian of Constantinople.
(Menologion of Basil II, 10th century).

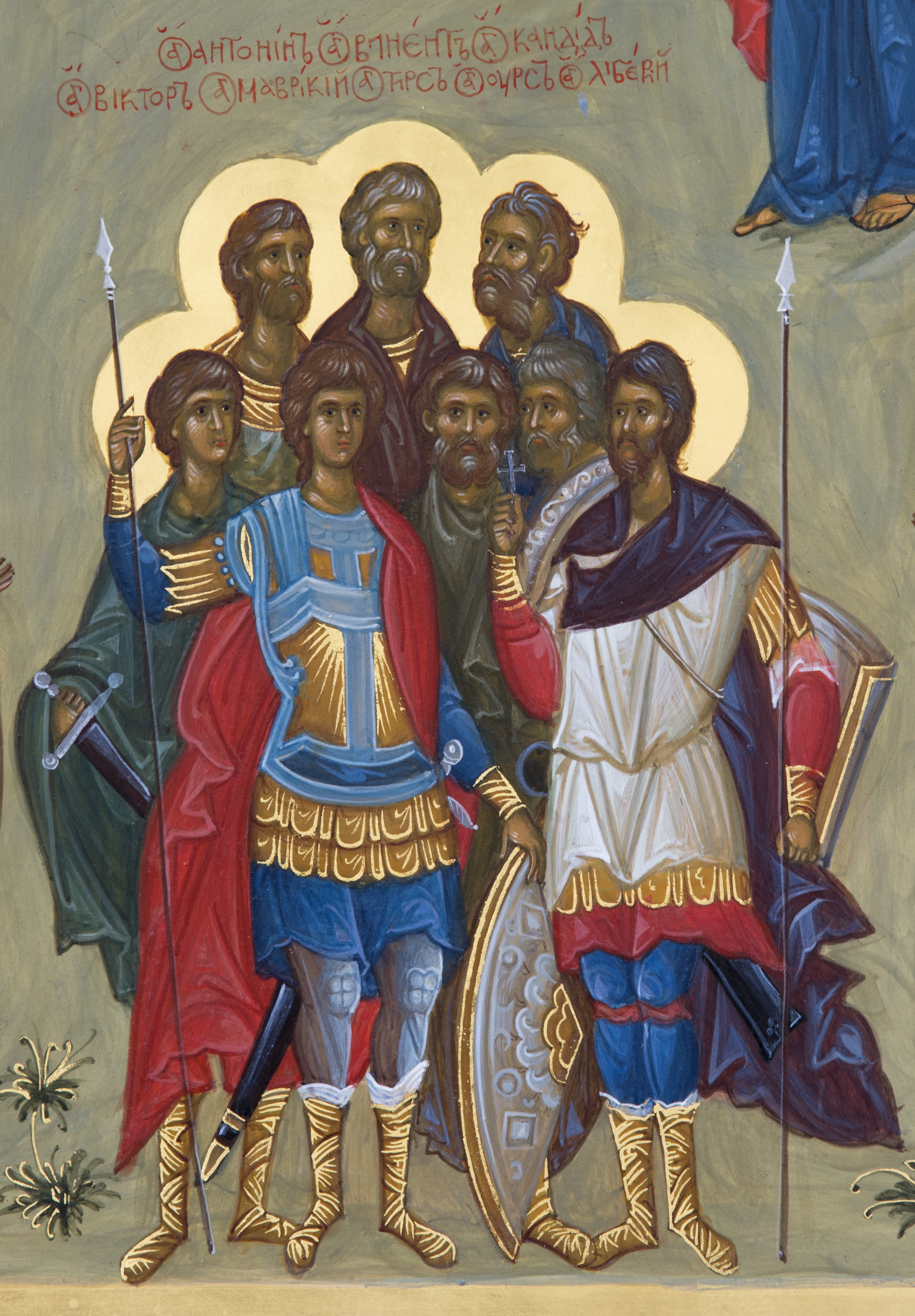
Holy Martyrs of the Theban Legion:
Antoninus, Vincentius, Candidus;
Victor, Maurice, Tyrsus, Ursus, Liberius.

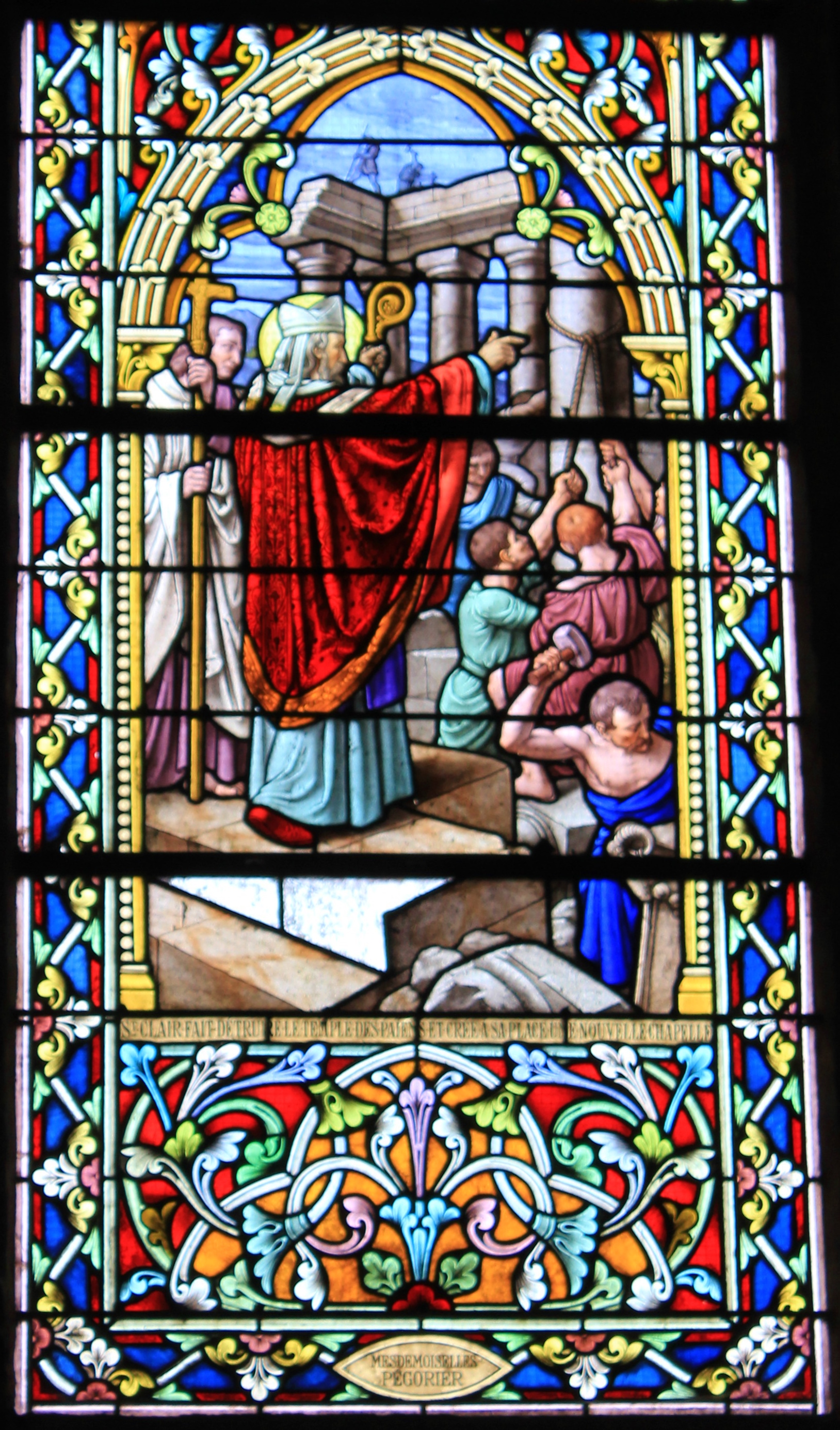
St. Clair of Nantes, destroying a pagan temple.

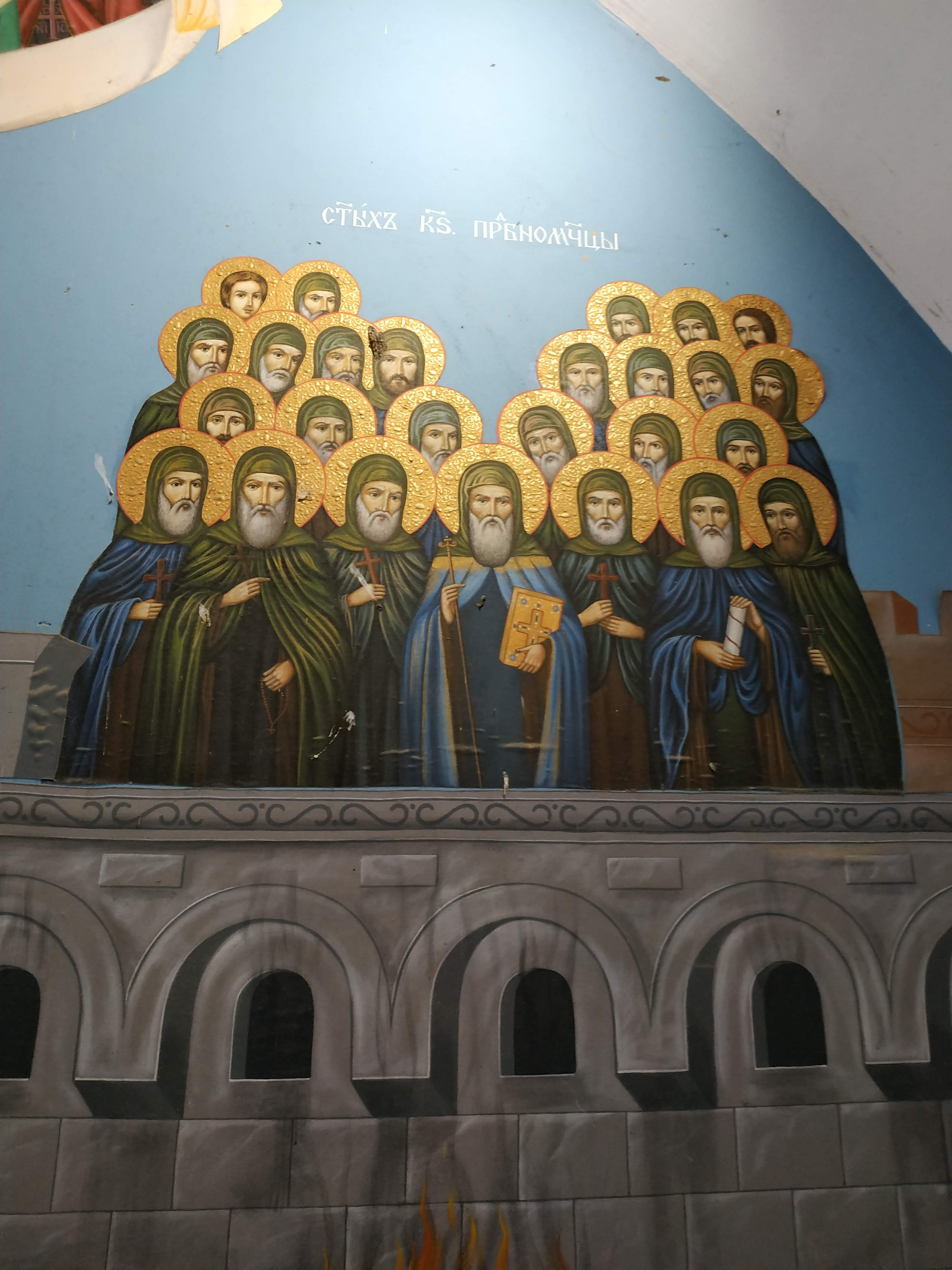
Venerable 26 Martyrs of Zographou Monastery, Mount Athos.

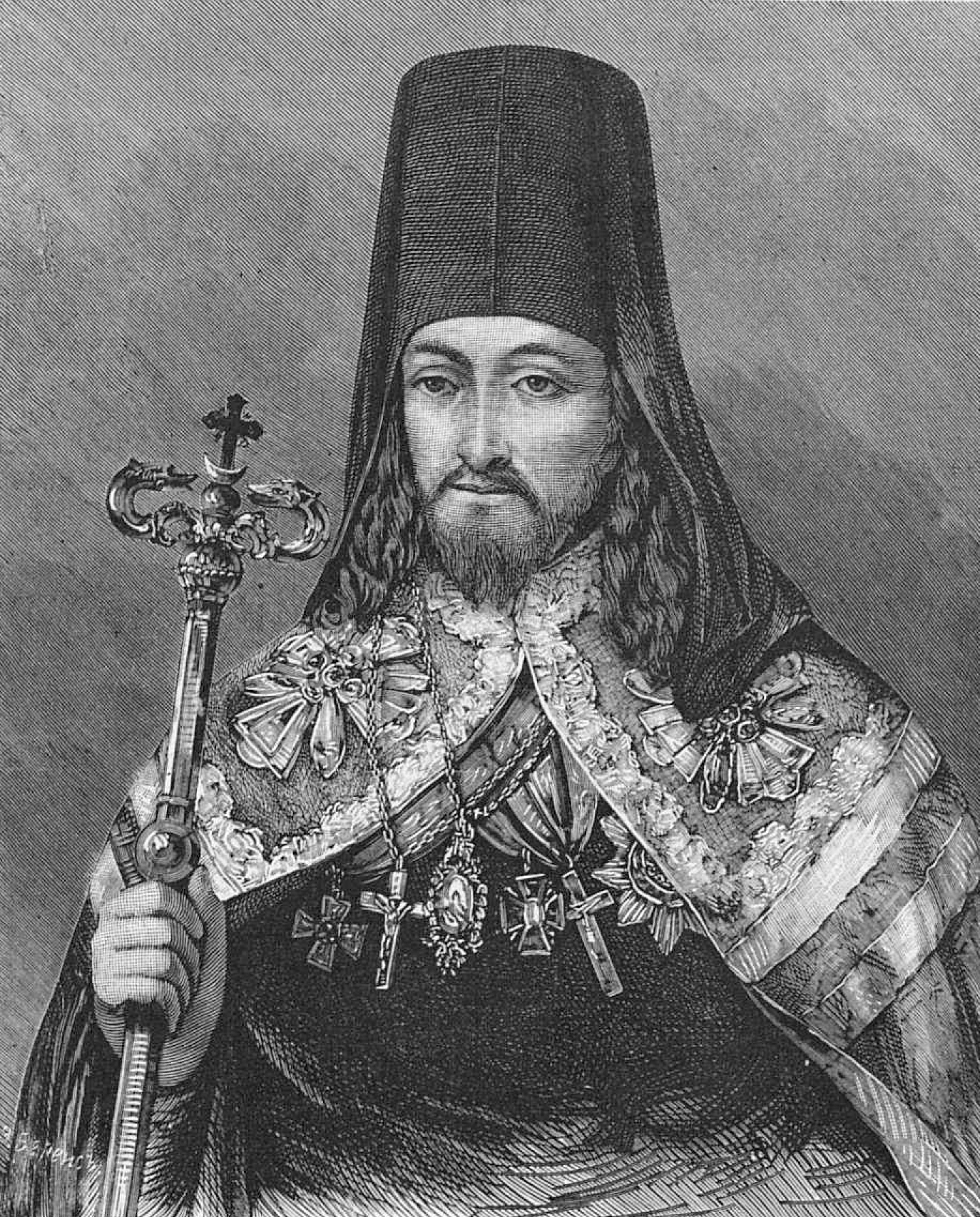
Saint Innocent, Bishop of Penza.

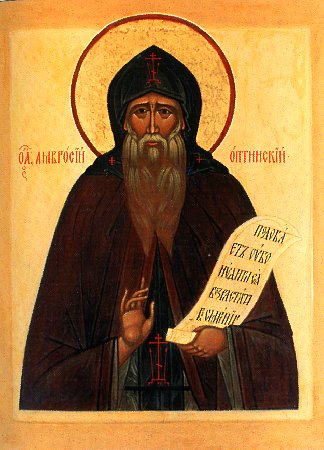
'Venerable Ambrose of Optina.

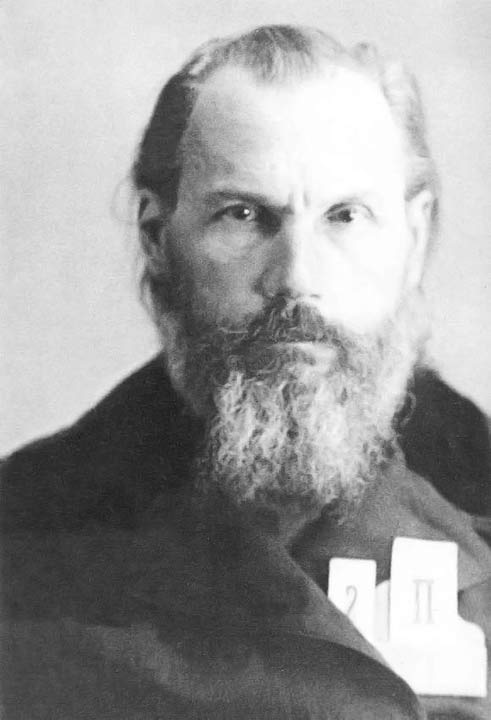
New Hieromartyr Theodore (Pozdeyevsky), Archbishop of Volokolamsk.

== Sources ==
- October 10/23. Orthodox Calendar (PRAVOSLAVIE.RU).
- October 23 / October 10. HOLY TRINITY RUSSIAN ORTHODOX CHURCH (A parish of the Patriarchate of Moscow).
- October 10. OCA - The Lives of the Saints.
- The Autonomous Orthodox Metropolia of Western Europe and the Americas (ROCOR). St. Hilarion Calendar of Saints for the year of our Lord 2004. St. Hilarion Press (Austin, TX). p. 75.
- The Tenth Day of the Month of October. Orthodoxy in China.
- October 10. Latin Saints of the Orthodox Patriarchate of Rome.
- The Roman Martyrology. Transl. by the Archbishop of Baltimore. Last Edition, According to the Copy Printed at Rome in 1914. Revised Edition, with the Imprimatur of His Eminence Cardinal Gibbons. Baltimore: John Murphy Company, 1916. pp. 313–314.
- Rev. Richard Stanton. A Menology of England and Wales, or, Brief Memorials of the Ancient British and English Saints Arranged According to the Calendar, Together with the Martyrs of the 16th and 17th Centuries. London: Burns & Oates, 1892. pp. 484–485.

Greek Sources

- Great Synaxaristes: (in Greek) 10 ΟΚΤΩΒΡΙΟΥ. ΜΕΓΑΣ ΣΥΝΑΞΑΡΙΣΤΗΣ.
- (in Greek) Συναξαριστής. 10 Οκτωβρίου. ECCLESIA.GR. (H ΕΚΚΛΗΣΙΑ ΤΗΣ ΕΛΛΑΔΟΣ).
- (in Greek) 10/10/2017. Ορθόδοξος Συναξαριστής.

Russian Sources

- (in Russian) 23 октября (10 октября). Православная Энциклопедия под редакцией Патриарха Московского и всея Руси Кирилла (электронная версия). (Orthodox Encyclopedia - Pravenc.ru).
- (in Russian) 10 октября по старому стилю / 23 октября по новому стилю. Русская Православная Церковь - Православный церковный календарь на 2016 год.
