= Bentel =

Bentel is a surname. Notable people with the surname include:

- Carol Rusche Bentel, American architect
- Dwight Bentel (1909–2012), American journalist and professor
- George R. Bentel (1876–1952), American automobile dealer
- Maria Bentel (1928–2000), American architect
- Mary Pat Bentel, American film producer
- Nikolas Bentel, American artist
