= Rusche =

Rusche is a surname of German origin, being a variant of the surname Rusch. Notable people with the surname include:

- Dietrich Rusche (1936-2024), German politician (CDU)
- Georg Rusche (1900-1950), German political economist and criminologist
- Herbert Rusche (1952-2024), German politician and LGBT activist
- John Rusche (born 1950), American politician
- Marjorie Rusche (born 1949), American composer

== See also ==
- Carol Rusche Bentel (born 1957), American architect and educator
- Rusch
- Rushe
