= Ondrej Spiegl =

Swedish figure skater

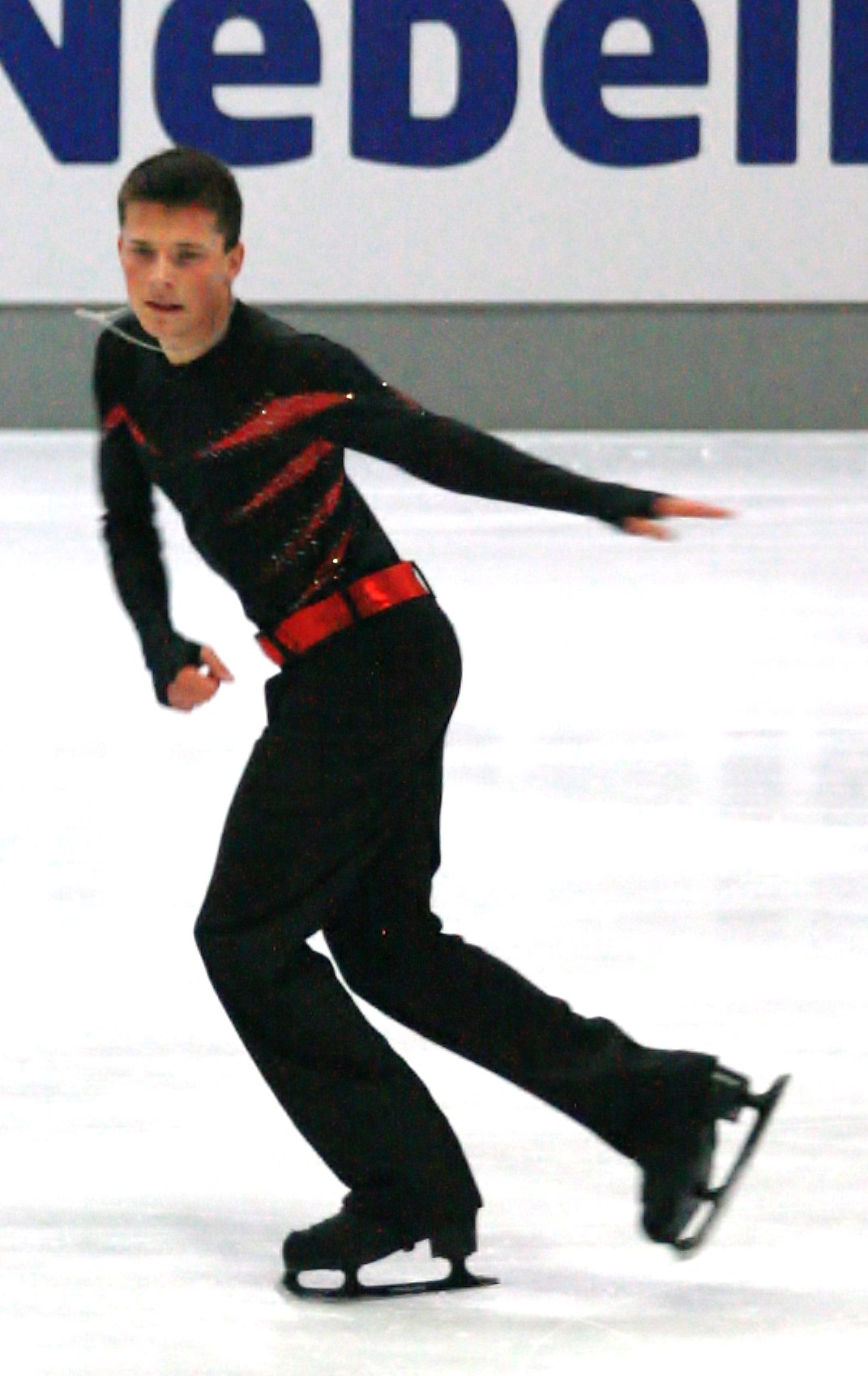
- Spiegl at the 2013 Nebelhorn Trophy

Personal information
- Native name: Ondřej Spiegl
- Born: 10 July 1993 (age 33) Brno, Czech Republic
- Home town: Stockholm, Sweden
- Height: 1.70 m (5 ft 7 in)

Figure skating career
- Country: Sweden
- Coach: Alan Spiegl, Moa Lindgren
- Skating club: Eskilstuna FSC
- Began skating: 1996

Ondrej Spiegl (born 10 July 1993) is a Swedish figure skater. He is a two-time Nordic medalist (silver in 2017, bronze in 2015) and a two-time Swedish national champion.

Spiegl holds a Master's degree in sports science. Following his figure skating career, he has authored several research papers on the biomechanics of figure skating landing impact and the effects of various blade and boot models. In 2022, he founded Blade Science, a company that designs and manufactures figure skating blades with shock-absorbing capability.

== Personal life ==
Ondřej Spiegl was born on 10 July 1993 in Brno, Czech Republic. He is the son of Vera and Alan Spiegl, a former pair skater who competed with his sister, Ingrid Spieglová, for Czechoslovakia. He has a younger brother, Lukas, who also practiced figure skating.

After living in Austria and the Czech Republic, Spiegl moved with his family to Sweden at the age of seven years and later became a Swedish citizen.

Spiegl received his Bachelor's degree in Sports from Masaryk University in 2015 (Brno, Czech Republic), followed by a Master's degree in sports science from the Swedish School of Sport and Health Science in Stockholm, Sweden in 2017.

== Career ==
Having begun learning to skate in Austria in 1996, Spiegl practiced in the Czech Republic from the age of five years and in Sweden from age seven. He debuted on the ISU Junior Grand Prix series in 2009 and placed 27th at the 2011 World Junior Championships in Gangneung, South Korea.

In October 2011, Spiegl competed for the first time on the senior level, at the 2011 Coupe Internationale de Nice, but he continued appearing on the junior level until the end of the 2012–13 season. He finished 28th at the 2013 World Junior Championships in Milan, Italy.

In the 2014–15 season, Spiegl won his first senior national title, ahead of Marcus Björk, and took the bronze medal at the 2015 Nordic Championships.

In 2015–16, Spiegl successfully defended his national title, outscoring Illya Solomin. He underwent surgery on both of his knees.

== Post-competitive career ==
Following the 2016-2017 season, Spiegl turned professional and performed for Willy Bietak Productions on Royal Caribbean cruise ships in ice shows from 2017 to 2019.

Spiegl also began research at the University of GIH, Stockholm, Sweden, focusing on landing impacts and injury prevention for figure skaters. This led to several grants from various universities and research organizations. In 2019, Spiegl and his colleagues at GIH published their initial findings in the Footwear Science journal, detailing the effects of different figure skating boots on landing impact loads.

In 2021 and 2022, Spiegl and his team published two further studies on how different ice skating blades affect landing impact and jump take-off. They also developed and tested a prototype blade with integrated shock absorbers with the aim of reducing forces that contribute to the frequent overuse injuries seen in figure skaters. They found that the prototype blade decreased the landing load compared to conventional blades without affecting jump height. Following the studies, Spiegl founded the Blade Science company in Brno, Czech Republic to manufacture the new blades. The company received support from the South Moravian Innovation Centre.

== Programs ==
Season	Short program	Free skating
2016–17	Tribal Music by Masala; Let's Do This by Johan Liljedahl	Rush by Hans Zimmer; Default by Django Django
2014–16	Swan Lake Reloaded by Salem Al Fakir, Moneybrother, Lune, Adiam Dymott, PH3 and Skizz, Mario Perez Amigo, Simsoak	Plunkett & Macleane by Craig Armstrong; Rochester; Business; Finding Beauty by Craig Armstrong; Grenade by Bruno Mars
2013–14	Torn; Resolve by Nathan Lanier	Plunkett & Macleane by Craig Armstrong; Rochester; Business; Finding Beauty by Craig Armstrong; Grenade by Bruno Mars
2011–13	Forest Battle (from Transformers: Revenge of the Fallen) by Steve Jablonsky	Saw by Charlie Clouser; Machismo (from Gone in 60 Seconds); Tequila by The Champs
2010–11	Transformers by Steve Jablonsky	Lux Aeterna by Clint Mansell

== Competitive highlights ==
CS: Challenger Series; JGP: Junior Grand Prix

International
Event	08–09	09–10	10–11	11–12	12–13	13–14	14–15	15–16	16–17
CS Lombardia									8th
CS Warsaw Cup									WD
Cup of Nice				22nd	16th				5th
FBMA Trophy								1st	
Nebelhorn Trophy						21st			
Nordics					4th		3rd		2nd
NRW Trophy							9th	11th	
Universiade							14th		22nd
Warsaw Cup					10th				
International: Junior
Junior Worlds			27th		28th				
JGP Croatia					15th				
JGP Italy				15th					
JGP Romania			9th	13th					
JGP Slovenia					15th				
JGP Turkey		17th							
JGP UK			10th						
Nordics		2nd J	2nd J						
NRW Trophy		9th J	10th J						
Seibt Memorial					1st J				
National
Swedish Champ.	1st J	1st J	5th		2nd		1st	1st	2nd
J = Junior level
