= Rush Township, Ohio =

Rush Township, Ohio may refer to:

- Rush Township, Champaign County, Ohio
- Rush Township, Scioto County, Ohio
- Rush Township, Tuscarawas County, Ohio

== See also ==
- Rush Township (disambiguation)
- Rush Creek Township, Fairfield County, Ohio
- Rushcreek Township, Logan County, Ohio
