= Rush (name) =

Rush is both an English surname and given name.

== People with the surname ==
- Andre Rush (born 1974), American celebrity chef and military veteran
- Andy Rush (1889–1969), American baseball pitcher
- Annaleah Rush (born 1976), New Zealand rugby union player
- Anthony Rush (born 1996), American football player
- Augustus John Rush (born 1942), American psychiatrist
- Barbara Rush (1927–2024), American actress
- Benjamin Rush (1745–1813), a Founding Father of the United States, physician, writer, educator and humanitarian
- Benjamin Rush (1811–1877), American lawyer and writer
- Bobby Rush (born 1946), U.S. Representative from Illinois
- Bobby Rush (musician) (born 1940), American blues and R&B musician, composer and singer
- Bob Rush (American football) (born 1955), American football player
- Bob Rush (Australian footballer) (1880–1975), Australian rules footballer and administrator
- Bob Rush (baseball) (1925–2011), American baseball pitcher
- Boyd Rush (1895–1964), first heart transplant recipient
- Brandon Rush (born 1985), American basketball player
- Brion Rush (born 1984), American basketball player
- Bryan Rush (1893–1982), Australian rules footballer
- Caroline Rush, Chief Executive of the British Fashion Council
- Cathy Rush (born 1947), American basketball coach
- Charles W. Rush (1919–2015), United States Navy captain
- Chris Rush (1946–2018), American comedian
- Christopher Rush (1965–2016), American illustrator
- Clay Rush (born 1973), former American football kicker
- Clive Rush (1931–1980), American football player
- Cooper Rush (born 1993), American football quarterback
- DJ Rush (born 1970), American musician, disc jockey, and record producer
- Dan Rush (born 1960), American union organizer
- Darius Rush (born 2000), American football player
- David Rush (disambiguation), multiple people
- Debbie Rush (born 1966), English actress
- Deborah Rush (born 1954), American actress
- Dick Rush (1882–1956), Austrian-born American character actor
- Don Rush, American director, script writer, voice actor and producer
- Ed T. Rush (active 1966–2003), American basketball referee
- Eddie Rush (born 1961), American basketball referee
- Edward Rush (cricketer), Australian cricketer
- Edward Rush (priest), Irish Anglican priest
- Elaine Rush, New Zealand professor of nutrition
- Emma Rush, lecturer in philosophy and ethics
- Eric Rush (born 1965), New Zealand rugby union footballer
- Fanny Rush, London-based portrait painter
- Florence Rush (1918–2008), American feminist organizer
- Francis Roberts Rush (1916–2001), Roman Catholic Archbishop of Brisbane
- Francis Rush (1921–1985), American politician
- Geoffrey Rush (born 1951), Australian actor and film producer
- Gerald Rush (1895–1988), Australian rules footballer
- Ian Rush (born 1961), Welsh former footballer and football manager
- James Rush (1786–1869), American physician and writer
- JaRon Rush (born 1979), American basketball player
- Jennifer Rush (born 1960), American pop rock singer and songwriter
- Joel Rush (born 1981), American actor and model
- Joseph H. Rush (1911–2006), American physicist
- Joshua Rush (born 2001), American actor
- Kareem Rush (born 1980), American basketball player
- Ken Rush (1931–2011), American racing driver
- Lenny Rush (born 2009), British actor
- Lyndon Rush (born 1980), Canadian bobsledder
- Matthew Rush (footballer) (born 1971), English footballer
- Matt Rush (born 2001), English footballer
- Merrilee Rush (born 1944), American singer
- Otis Rush (1934–2018), American blues singer and guitarist
- Red Rush (1927–2009), American sportscaster
- Richard Rush (1780–1859), United States Attorney General and Secretary of the Treasury
- Richard Rush (director) (1929–2021), American film director
- Richard H. Rush (1825–1893), American military officer
- Scott Rush (born 1985), Australian drug trafficker, member of the Bali Nine imprisoned in Indonesia
- Stockton Rush (1962–2023), American businessman and CEO
- Tom Rush (born 1941), American singer
- William Rush (disambiguation), multiple people
- Xavier Rush (born 1977), New Zealand former rugby union footballer

== People with the given name ==
- Rush Brown (1954–2020), American football defensive lineman
- Rush Clark (1834–1879), 19th-century American politician and lawyer
- Rush Holt Sr. (1905–1955), U.S. Senator from West Virginia
- Rush Holt Jr. (born 1948), U.S. Representative from New Jersey
- Rush Kalaria (born 1993), Indian cricketer
- Rush Limbaugh Sr. (1891–1996), American attorney and civic leader in Missouri
- Rush Limbaugh (1951–2021), American talk show host, grandson of the above
- Rush Propst (born 1957), American high school football coach
- Rush Rhees (1905–1989), American philosopher
- Rush Sturges (born 1985), American whitewater kayaker, filmmaker and musician
- Rush Wimberly (1873–1943), American politician

== See also ==
- Rush § People, Rush as a stage name or mononym
