= Rusch =

Rusch is a surname. Notable people with the surname include:

- Adolf Rusch (1435–1489), notable German printer and publisher
- Arthur Rusch, American politician
- Bob Rusch (born 1943), American jazz critic and record producer
- Frank Rusch (born 1929), researcher on self-instructional strategies, coworker and natural supports, benefit-cost analysis
- Glendon Rusch (born 1974), left-handed former Major League Baseball pitcher
- Jerry Rusch (1943–2003), American jazz trumpeter
- Kristine Kathryn Rusch (born 1960), American writer and editor
- Leslie Rusch (born 1958), American and Canadian electrical engineer
- Nicholas J. Rusch (1822–1864), tutor, farmer, member of the Iowa Senate (1858–1860), the second Lieutenant Governor of Iowa (1860–1862), Iowa's Commissioner of Immigration, and a captain in the Union Army during the American Civil War
- Paul Rusch (1897–1979), lay missionary of the Anglican Church in Japan
- Thomas Rusch (born 1962), German photographer living in Berlin, Hamburg and Paris

== See also ==
- Rusch Botanical Gardens in Citrus Heights, California, USA
- Rausch (disambiguation)
- Reusch (disambiguation)
- Ruch (disambiguation)
- Rusche
- Ruschein
- Ruschia
- Rush (disambiguation)
- Ruysch (disambiguation)
