= Andrew of Totma =

Russian hermit

Andrew of Totma was a seventeenth century Russian Orthodox Church religious figure.

Andrew was born in countryside nearby Totma the town and named after Saint Andrew Stratelates. According to the Gospel he left his parents and went to desert places. When he came back his parents was dead. Then he left the Ust-Tolshma and went to the Monastery of Galic (Russian: Галичский Воскресенский монастырь). After time in the Monastery of Galic he became a yurodivy and moved to Totma. He was known for prayer and begging his bread. His feast day is celebrated on 10 October.
