= No Rush =

No Rush may refer to:

- "No Rush", a song by T-Pain from Oblivion (2017)
- "No Rush", a song by Doda from Aquaria (2022)

== See also ==
- Rush (disambiguation)
