= USS William R. Rush =

USS William R. Rush had been the name of more than one United States Navy ship, and may refer to:

- USS William R. Rush (DE-288), a destroyer escort cancelled before construction began in 1944
- USS William R. Rush (DE-556), a destroyer escort cancelled before construction began in 1944
- USS William R. Rush (DD-714), a destroyer in commission from 1945 to 1978

== See also ==
- USS Rush
