= Rushe =

Rushe is a surname. Notable people with the surname include:

- Anthony Rushe (d. 1577), British cannon
- David Rushe (1827–1886), British Army sergeant-major
- James Lardner (politician) (1879–1925), Irish politician
- Liam Rushe (born 1990), Irish hurler
- Padraig Rushe (born 1982), Irish businessman
