= Ruch =

Ruch may refer to:

== Settlements ==
- Ruch, Gironde, a commune in France
- Ruch, Oregon, an unincorporated community in Jackson County, Oregon
- Ruch-e Olya, a village in Qazvin Province, Iran
- Ruch-e Sofla, Qazvin, a village in Qazvin Province, Iran

== In Poland ==
One of the meanings of ruch in Polish is movement.

=== Sport ===
- Ruch Chorzów, a football club from Poland
- Ruch Radzionków, a football club from Poland
- Ruch Wysokie Mazowieckie, a football club from Poland
- Ruch Zdzieszowice, a football club from Poland

=== Organisations ===
- Prasa-Książka-Ruch, a state-owned newspaper monopoly in communist Poland
- Ruch catalog (Ilustrowany Katalog Znaczków Polskich), catalogue of postage stamps
- Ruch Narodowy, a Polish far-right political party
- Ruch Palikota, a former Polish political party
- Ruch (organisation), a former Polish underground organisation

== People ==
Notable people with the surname Ruch include:

- Angela Ruch (born 1983), American stock car racing driver
- Charlie Ruch (1862–1937), American businessman, owner and president of the Philadelphia Phillies from 1930 to 1932
- Daniel Ruch (born 1983), American soccer coach
- Dave Ruch (born 1964), American performer and teaching artist
- Günter Ruch (1956–2010), German writer and politician
- Hans Ruch (1898–1947), German footballer
- John Ruch (1834–1912), member of the Wisconsin State Assembly
- Peter Ruch (born 1941), Swiss Olympic shooter
- Stewart E. Ruch III (consecrated 2013), American Anglican bishop

== Other uses ==
- Ruch (river), Perm Krai, Russia
- Ruching, a technique for gathering fabric

== See also ==
- Rusch, a surname
