= USCGC Rush =

USCGC Rush has been the name of more than one United States Coast Guard cutter, and may refer to:

- USCGC Rush (WPC-151), later USCGC Rush (WSC-151), an Active-class patrol boat
- USCGC Rush (WHEC-723), a Hamilton-class cutter
- USCGC Rush (WMSM-918), a Heritage-class cutter

== See also ==
- USRC Rush, revenue cutters of the United States Revenue-Marine (1790–1894) and United States Revenue Cutter Service (1894–1915)
- USS Rush, ships of the United States Navy
