= Padraig Rushe =

Irish musician

Padraig Rushe is an Irish entrepreneur, businessman, writer and musician.

== Business career ==
He is the Founder & CEO of Initiative Financial Services t/a Initiative Ireland, an ESG (Environmental, Social and Governance) Finance Company focused on supporting the delivery of energy-efficient, social and affordable housing across Ireland. He is Managing Director of Initiative Ireland Nominees, a trust and company service provider. Rushe has held roles within Financial Services Industry, Medical Technology Industry and the Entertainment Industry. A graduate of Trinity College Dublin, he earned his MBA in 2013. He also holds a BA Honours from University College Dublin.

== Music career ==
Outside of his business career, Rushe spent years as a singer-songwriter and musician. He is a former member of the Dublin Gospel Choir, with whom he released 3 albums. In May 2008, he was featured on MTV's "Get Seen Get Heard: Contenders". In 2009 he recorded and released his own solo album GreyWold, on his own independent record and management label Loud Child.

=== Recording catalogue ===
- Dublin Gospel Choir – Nights of Soul (2003)
- Dublin Gospel Choir – DGC Live (2004)
- Today FM – Even Better Than the Real Thing Vol. 2 (2004)
- Dublin Gospel Choir – Moving On (2006)
- Paddy Casey – Addicted to Company (2008)
- Padraig Rushe – Gonna be a Change (2009)
- Padraig Rushe – Greyworld (2009)
- Padraig Rushe – New House Rising (2009)
