= Maharsapor =

Persian Martyr

Saint Maharsapor
- Born: Persia
- Died: 421; Persia
- Feast: 10 October

Saint Maharsapor (or Sapor; died 421) was an early Persian Christian martyr who is considered a saint. Different sources give his feast day as 10 October, 2 November or 27 November.

== Life ==
Maharsapor was a Persian of noble family who was brought up as a Christian. After the destruction of a Zoroastrian temple, King Yazdegerd I (r. 399–420) launched a persecution of the Christians. Maharsapor, Narses (or Parses) and Sabutaka were arrested and tortured. Narses and Sabutaka were executed, but Maharsapor was held in prison for three years, and was periodically tortured and offered his freedom if he would abandon his faith. Eventually, in the reign of Bahram V (r. 420–438), he was thrown in a pit and starved to death.

== Monks of Ramsgate account ==
The Monks of Ramsgate wrote in their Book of saints : a dictionary of servants of God canonized by the Catholic Church (1921),

Maharsapor (St.) M (Nov 2) (5th century) A Persian Christian who suffered martyrdom under the persecuting King Varanes (A.D. 421). After a three years’ imprisonment, he was thrown into a pit and left to die of hunger.

== Butler's account ==
The hagiographer Alban Butler wrote in his Lives of the Primitive Fathers, Martyrs, and Other Principal Saints (1799),

St. Maharsapor, Martyr

THIS glorious martyr was a Persian prince of noble extraction, but far more distinguished by his virtue, and by his zeal for Christian faith. On this account the persecution was no sooner raised by Isdegerdes, but Maharsapor was seized the first of all others, together with Parses and Sabutaca. The two latter, after divers tortures, finished their martyrdom by the order and sentence of a judge named Hormisdavarus, a man raised to that dignity from a slave, but still baser by his manners than by his birth. By this inhuman and vile magistrate Maharsapor was often examined, and put to the torture: after which he was left to languish three years in prison, in stench and hunger. This term being elapsed, the same judge again examined the champion of Christ, and finding him steadfast and invincible in confessing Christ, he condemned him to be thrown into a dark pit, there to perish with hunger. Several days after this sentence had been executed, certain officers and soldiers opened the pit, and found the martyr’s body without life indeed, but in light, and on his knees, as if he had been in prayer, in which posture the saint, triumphing by such a death over his enemies, had breathed out his pure soul. St. Maharsapor suffered in October, in the year of our Lord 421, the second of Vararanes V. See Stephen Evodius Assemani, Act. Mart. Orient. t. 1. p 234.

== Sources ==
- Butler, Alban (1799), The Lives of the Primitive Fathers, Martyrs, and Other Principal Saints... by the Rev. Alban Butler..., vol. XI: November., J. Moir
- "Saint Maharsapor the Persian", CatholicSaints.info
- Monks of Ramsgate (1921), The Book of saints : a dictionary of servants of God canonized by the Catholic Church, St. Augustine's Abbey (Ramsgate, England), London: A. & C. Black, ltd.
