= Rush Lake =

Rush Lake may refer to:

== Places ==
Canada

- Rush Lake, Saskatchewan

United States

- Rush Lake, Wisconsin
- Rush Lake Township, Minnesota
- Rush Lake Township, North Dakota

== Lakes ==
Pakistan

- Rush Lake (Pakistan), near Rush Peak in Gilgit-Baltistan, Pakistan

United States

- Rush Lake (Michigan), part of Rush Lake State Game Area in Michigan
- Rush Lake (Minnesota), a lake in Otter Tail County, Minnesota
- Rush Lake, in Minneota Township, Minnesota of Jackson County
- Rush Lake, in Sioux Valley Township, Minnesota of Jackson County
- Rush Lake (South Dakota)
- Rush Lake (Iron County, Utah)
- Rush Lake (Tooele County, Utah), a remnant of Lake Bonneville
- Rush Lake (Wisconsin), a lake in Winnebago County, Wisconsin
