= Nikolas Bentel =

Italian-American artist and designer

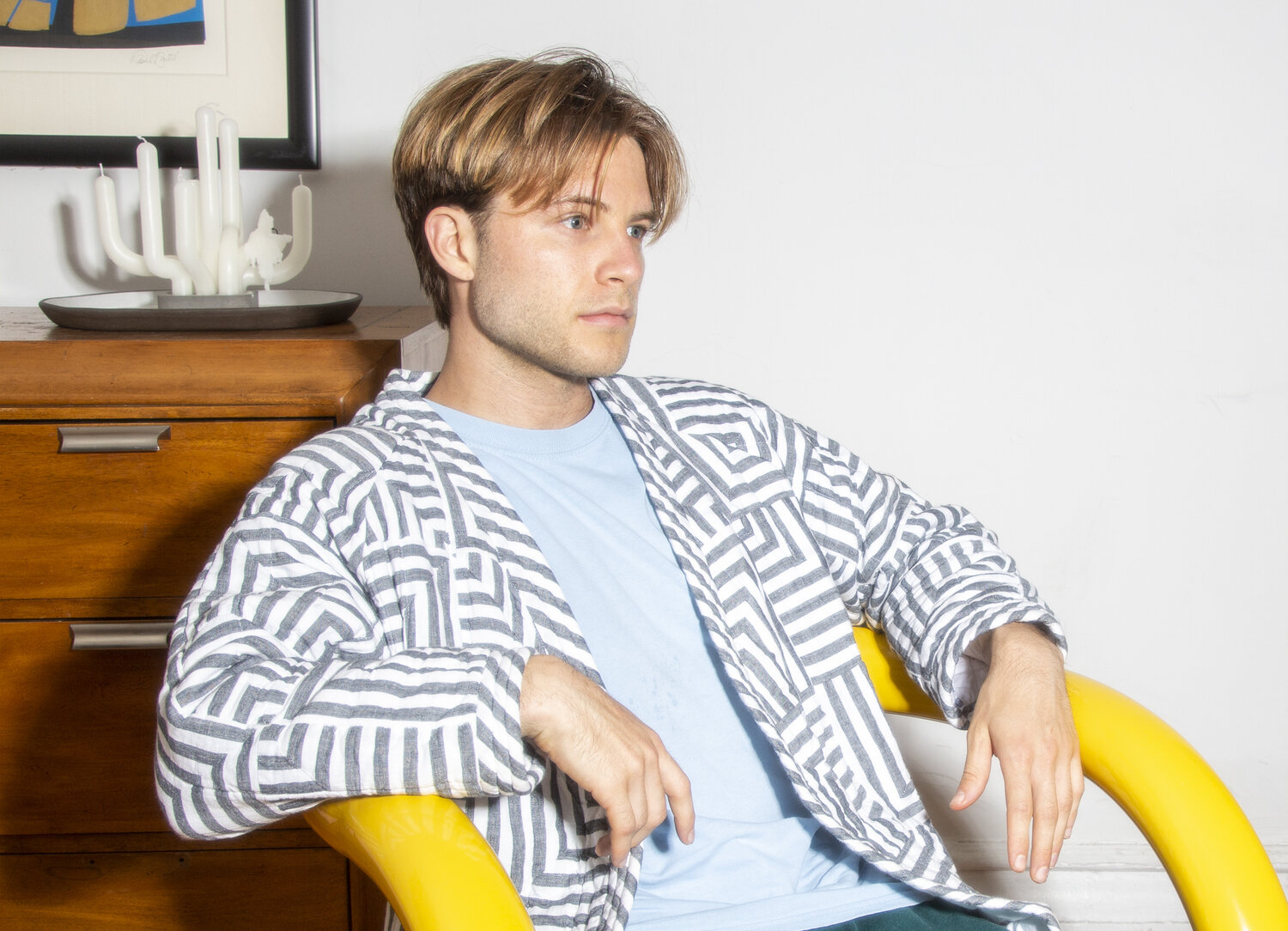
- Born: Nikolas Gregory Bentel; November 23, 1993 (age 32)
- Education: Brown University (BA); Rhode Island School of Design (BFA); Columbia University (MArch)
- Occupations: Designer, Artist
- Website: nikbentel.com

Nikolas Gregory Bentel (born 1993) is an artist and designer based in New York. He is the founder of Nik Bentel Studio.

== Early life and education ==
Bentel was born in 1993 to architects Carol Bentel and Paul Bentel. He was raised in Queens and Long Island, New York.

Bentel attended Montessori and Waldorf schools before enrolling in a dual-degree program at Brown University and the Rhode Island School of Design (RISD). In 2017, he earned a Bachelor of Arts in Modern Culture and Media from Brown and a Bachelor of Fine Arts in Industrial Design from RISD. He later received a Master of Architecture from the Columbia University Graduate School of Architecture, Planning and Preservation in 2022.

== Career ==
Bentel founded Nik Bentel Studio in 2017 to design limited-edition objects.

In 2018, Bentel launched The Erased Rauschenberg. For the project, he purchased a 1973 print by Robert Rauschenberg and sold one-inch squares of its surface as advertisement space, using the funds to acquire the artwork. The final piece was auctioned in March 2018. That same year, he produced a project titled All Purpose Nik, in which he created a series of patented poses to function as human furniture. This "Corpus Collection" was exhibited at the International Contemporary Furniture Fair in New York.

In 2021, Bentel released the Pasta Bag, a leather handbag designed to replicate a blue box of Barilla penne pasta. It was done for trompe-l’oeill purposes and later he received a cease-and-desist letter regarding the purposeful unauthorized use of its branding. In 2022, he released a handbag fashioned to look like a generic brown shipping box covered in mailing labels. Later that year, he collaborated with Absolut Vodka on a set of Espresso Martini-themed handbags.

In 2024, Bentel designed the Orb Bag, a spherical, mirrored handbag modeled on a Dupin cyclide geometric form. In September 2024, Bentel collaborated with the retailer Lidl and released the Croissant Bag during London Fashion Week, with proceeds from the sale donated to charity.

In 2025, Bentel released the Mixer and speaker handbag, acrylic handbags with an integrated Bluetooth speaker and four-channel DJ mixer, and the RC Car Bag, a leather purse mounted on a remote-controlled chassis capable of speeds up to nine mph.

His other work includes the Loopy Chair, a sculptural aluminum piece constructed from modular industrial parts, a handbag based on an electrical extension cord, and work with Areaware on a set of whimsically shaped Doodle Crayons.
