= David Rush =

David Rush may refer to:

- David Rush (footballer) (born 1971), English footballer
- David Rush (rapper) (born 1983), American rapper
- David J. Rush (former American intelligence official and former member of the United States Navy Reserve), charged in 2026 for the alleged theft of government property

== See also ==
- David Rush Morrison, American cinematographer
- David Rushe (1827–1886), English recipient of the Victoria Cross
