= Maria Bentel =

American architect (1928–2000)

- Born: Maria-Luise Ramona Azzarone; July 15, 1928; New York City, New York, U.S.
- Died: November 8, 2000 (aged 72); Locust Valley, New York, U.S.
- Occupation: Architect
- Known for: Founding partner of the architecture firm Bentel & Bentel Architects/Planners A.I.A

Maria Bentel (July 15, 1928 – November 8, 2000) was an American architect. She is known for her work as a founding partner of the architecture firm Bentel & Bentel Architects/Planners A.I.A.

== Early life ==
Maria Bentel, née Maria-Luise Ramona Azzarone, was born on June 15, 1928, in New York City to Maria Teresa (née Massaro) and Louis Azzarone, both of Italy. Bentel grew up in Jackson Heights, Queens. She attended Hunter College High School (at the time an all-girls school) and went on to the Massachusetts Institute of Technology, completing the five-year bachelor of architecture program in 1951 as one of four females in her class. She studied with Alvar Aalto, Ralph Rapson, Pietro Belluschi and Laurence Anderson. After graduation, she received a Fulbright-Hays Scholarship for 1952-1953, which she spent attending the Istituto Universitario di Architettura di Venezia.

== Education ==
Maria Bentel earned a Bachelor of Architecture from MIT in 1951. She was a Fulbright scholar, Scuola d'Architettura, Venice, Italy (1952-53). In 1976, she became one of the first women to become a Fellow in the American Institute of Architects. A year later she began teaching architecture at the New York Institute of Technology.

== Career ==
She was a lecturer at the City University of New York before becoming a teacher at the Architecture School of New York Institute of Technology.

=== Bentel & Bentel ===
Maria and her husband Frederick Bentel founded the architectural firm Bentel & Bentel in 1957. As of November 2024 its three principals are their sons Peter and Paul Bentel and Paul's wife Carol Rusche Bentel.

==== Notable works ====
- Reconstructionist Synagogue of the North Shore (North Shore Unitarian Church) Expansion (1967)

== Personal life ==
Maria moved to Boston to study architecture at Massachusetts Institute of Technology. She married her husband Frederick Bentel in 1952.

== Awards ==
Bentel & Bentel received 13 awards in design in architecture from organizations such as The AIA National Chapter and Archi Awards before her death in 2000. Since her death, Bentel & Bentel has gone on to win 86 more awards for their accomplishments.

== Death ==
Maria Bentel died on November 8, 2000, at her home in Locust Valley from complications of bone marrow cancer. She was 72.
