= USS Rush =

USS Rush has been the name of more than one United States Navy ship, and may refer to:

- USS Rush (SP-712), a patrol boat commissioned in 1917 and wrecked later the same year
- USS Rush (WSC-151), a United States Coast Guard cutter commissioned in 1927 which served in the United States Navy as a patrol craft from 1941 to 1946 and was decommissioned in 1947. While folklore claims this ship's name led to the expression "get there before the rush," the phrase actually dates back at least to 1896, and seems unrelated to earlier revenue cutters as well.

== See also ==
- USRC Rush, revenue cutters of the United States Revenue-Marine (1790–1894) and United States Revenue Cutter Service (1894–1915)
- USCGC Rush, cutters of the United States Coast Guard
- USS William R. Rush
