= USRC Rush =

USRC Rush may refer to several revenue cutters of the United States Revenue-Marine (1790–1894) and United States Revenue Cutter Service (1894-1915):

- USRC Benjamin Rush, launched in 1827 and sold in 1833
- USRC Rush (1831), in commission from 1831 to 1840
- USRC Richard Rush, in commission from 1874 to 1885
- USRC Rush (1885), in commission from 1885 to 1912

== See also ==
- USCGC Rush, cutters of the United States Coast Guard
- USCGC Rush (WHEC-723), a United States Coast Guard high endurance cutter
- USCGC Rush (WMSM-918), a United States Coast Guard medium endurance cutter
- USS Rush, ships of the United States Navy
