= Eulampius and Eulampia =

Saints Eulampius and Eulampia
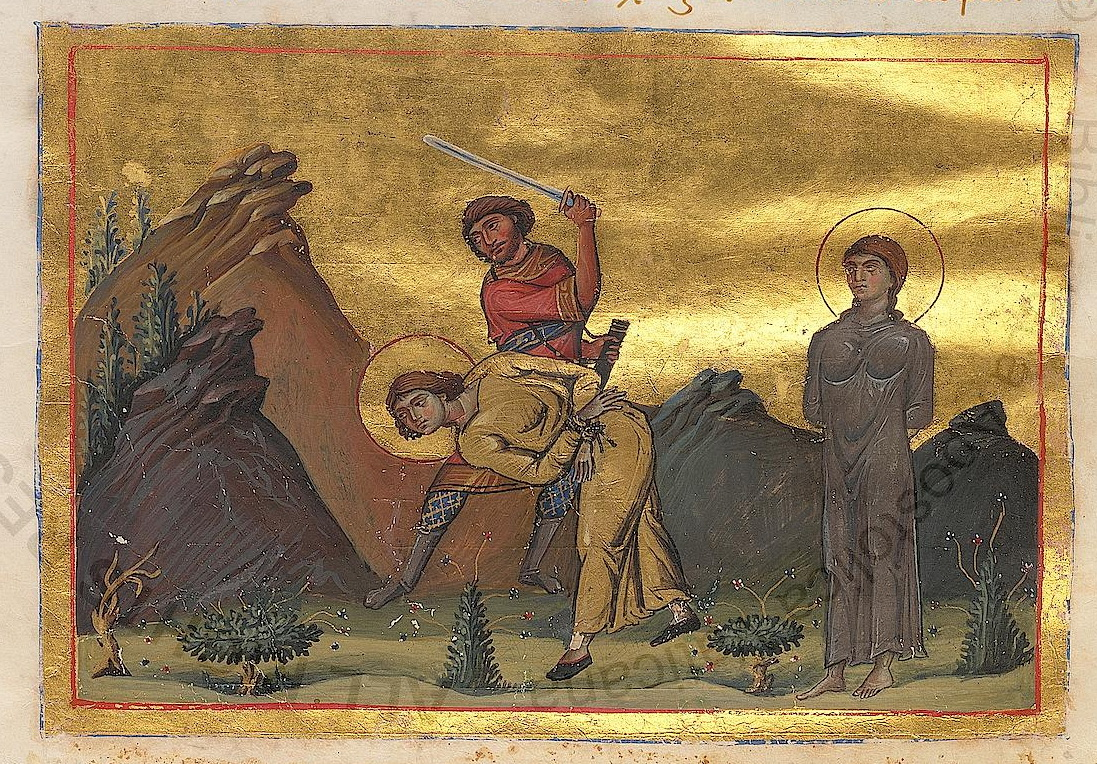

Martyrs
- Born: Nicomedia, Asia Minor (modern-day İzmit, Kocaeli, Turkey)
- Died: 310 AD; Nicomedia, Asia Minor (modern-day İzmit, Kocaeli, Turkey)
- Feast: October 10

Saints Eulampius and Eulampia (died 310 AD) are venerated as 3rd century Christian martyrs. According to tradition, they were brother and sister and natives of Nicomedia and were executed during the reign of Roman emperor Maximinus.

According to tradition, Eulampius was arrested by the Roman authorities during an attempt to buy supplies for Christians who were hiding in caves on the outskirts of Nicomedia. After Eulampius was whipped, his sister Eulampia was arrested after she identified herself by emerging from a crowd to embrace and comfort him.

Eulampius and Eulampia were executed the next day. According to Christian tradition, two hundred soldiers, moved by the courage of the two siblings, converted to Christianity and were themselves martyred.
