= Pinytus =

Bishop of Knossos and saint (late 2nd century)

Saint Pinytus

Bishop of Knossos
- Died: 180
- Venerated in: Roman Catholic Church, Eastern Orthodox Church
- Canonized: pre-congregation
- Feast: 10 October

Saint Pinytus (Greek: Άγιος Πινυτός), a Greek by birth, was Bishop of Knossos in Crete in the late 2nd century.

Not much is known about his life but it is known that Pinytus was looked up to by Eusebius of Caesarea, who said that he was one of the foremost ecclesiastical writers of his time. Pinytus was in constant contact with Dionysius of Corinth and it seemed the two had disagreements. Dionysius, it appears, wrote to the Pinytus asking him not to impose too strict a yoke of chastity upon his brethren and to keep in mind the weakness of the average people. But Pinytus was unmoved by this counsel and replied that Dionysius might impart stronger doctrine(what Pinytus calls "Solid food") and feed his congregation with a more perfect epistle inasmuch as Christians could not always subsist on "milk or tarry in childhood" when they grow old and mature as a Christian, which is not enough for a nourishment of the community maturing in faith. Eusebius attests to his orthodoxy and his care for the welfare of those placed under him.

== Bibliography ==
- Hist. eccl., iv. 21, 23, Eng. transl, NPNF, 2 ser., i. 197–198, 200–202
- New Schaff-Herzog Encyclopedia of Religious Knowledge, Vol. IX: Petri – Reuchlin
