= Thomas Rusch =

German photographer (born 1962)

- Born: 10 October 1962 (age 63); Freiburg im Breisgau, Baden-Württemberg, Germany
- Occupation: Photographer

Thomas Rusch (born October 10, 1962 in Freiburg im Breisgau) is a German photographer living in Berlin, Hamburg and Paris.

== Life and work ==
After finishing school, Thomas Rusch moved to Hamburg in 1981 to start his education as photographer. His first publication was a series of portraits at Schleswig-Holstein Musik Festival published in weekly magazine Stern. This was followed by a long-term cooperation with Stern, in which Thomas Rusch published many reportages, portraits and cover pictures. At the end of the 1990s Thomas Rusch's portraits of well-known celebrities were published in magazines like Zeitmagazin, Der Spiegel, Max and GQ. At the same time, Rusch showed his artistical work, e.g. Paradise Lost, Cirque O, and Die Ecke (The Corner), in price-winning exhibitions around the world.

From the late 1990s on, Thomas Rusch lived in Paris. He worked as a beauty- and fashion photographer and published his work in indie publications like Soon, Tank, and Oyster, as well as in numerous international fashion- and lifestyle magazines. Rusch shot campaigns (e.g. for Ray Ban, Beck's, Seat) and developed his own artistical projects.

Since 2006, Thomas Rusch is commuting between Paris, Hamburg and Berlin. He is still working for editorials and advertising, but at the same time he is focussing on his work as an artist. In his freelanced projects, Thomas Rusch is concerned with the subjects of sexuality, representation of women in western society, and fetishism. He likes to examine their ambivalent qualities between the private and the public, art and commerce - oscillating between a clear emphasis on naturalness and an exaggeration of superficiality. His last exhibitions were focussing on themes like masks (Behind, 2010, portraits of faces with heavy make-up) and skin (A Fleur de Peau, 2014, studies on the subject of skin)

== Exhibitions ==
- 2014 A Fleur de Peau, Bettina von Arnim Gallery, Paris
- 2013 Bettina von Arnim Gallery, Paris
- 2010 Behind, Stageback Gallery, Shanghai
- 2009 Homage to Irving Penn, Galerie Hiltawsky, Hamburg/Berlin
- 2008 Play, Galerie Chappe, Paris
- 2002 Die Ästhetik der Lüste, Fotomuseum Leipzig
- 2002 Icon, Aplanat Galerie, Hamburg
- 2001 Jolis Momes, Acte 2, Paris
- 2000 Die Ästhetik der Lüste, Fotomuseum Leipzig
- 1996 Erotik in Deutschland, Museum für Kunst und Gewerbe, Hamburg
- 1995-2012 Bildermode – Modebilder. German fashion photography. Curated by F.C. Gundlach, stations in New York, Milan, Taipei, Seoul, Tokyo, Beijing, Hong Kong, Singapore, Lisbon, a.o.
- 1995 Die Ecke, Image-Kastannus Oy, Helsinki
- 1994 Zeitgeist Becomes Form, Goethe-Institut, New York
- 1993 Paradise Lost, Kulturzentrum Gasteig, Munich
- 1993 Alexandra S., Deutsche Fototage, Frankfurt
- 1992 Internationaler Salon für Fotografie + Design, Cologne
- 1992 Die Ecke, Galerie Rahmel – 17 Subway Stations, Cologne
- 1992 Paradise Lost, PPS Galerie F.C. Gundlach, Sheila Metzner + Thomas Rusch, Hamburg
- 1992 Paradise Lost, Museo Ken Damy, Brescia
- 1991 Modewelten, Museum für Kunst und Gewerbe, Hamburg
- 1990 Paradise Lost, Museum House of Painters, Moscow
- 1987 Schleswig-Holstein Musik Festival, Grauwert Galerie, Hamburg

== Awards ==
- 4x Art Directors Club, Germany
- Art Directors Club of Europe
- 2008 SPD Award, New York
- 2006 FWA Red Dot Award
- 2004 Canon ProFashional Photo Award
- 1992 Kodak Portrait Award
- 1991, 1987 Kodak European Award

== Collections ==
- Second Bert Hartkamp Collection, Amsterdam
- F.C. Gundlach Collection, Hamburg
- Museum für Kunst und Gewerbe, Hamburg
- The Finnish Museum of Photography, Helsinki
- Museo Ken Damy, Brescia

== Literature ==
- 2010 Thomas Rusch. The Artificial Face – mask and masquerade, in: Eyemazing, Issue 3, 2010. ASIN: B00510IC4A
- 2010 Blink Magazine. Contemporary Photography, No. 5, ISBN 978-89-965709-5-0
- 2010 Blink Magazine. Contemporary Photography, No. 1
- 2006 All Allure, edited by Robert Klanten, Berlin, Die Gestalten Verlag. ISBN 3-89955-100-1
- 2002 Thomas Rusch - Icon, with texts by Hellmut Karasek and Wolfgang Behnken, Hamburg, Aplanat Edition. ISBN 3-922805-77-9
- 1997 Surrealities, edited by Andreas Peyerl, Robert Klanten, Berlin, Die Gestalten Verlag. ISBN 3-931126-03-X
- 1995 Bildermode – Modebilder. Deutsche Modephotographien von 1945 bis 1995, edited Wulf Herzogenrath, with texts by F.C. Gundlach, K. Honnef, E. Kaufold, Berlin, IFA. ASIN: B00B59NXOK
- 1992 Thomas Rusch - Paradise Lost, with text by Shuhei Takahashi, Tokio, Treville. ISBN 4-8457-0724-1
- 1988 Sinfonien in Herrenhäusern und Scheunen. Das Schleswig-Holstein Musik Festival, edited by Werner Burkhardt et al., Hamburg, Rasch und Röhring Verlag. ISBN 3-89136-197-1
