= Rush (2013 soundtrack) =

Soundtrack album by Hans Zimmer
- Released: 10 September 2013
- Genre: Film score; glam rock
- Length: 65:06
- Label: Sony Classical; WaterTower
- Producer: Hans Zimmer

Hans Zimmer chronology
The Lone Ranger (2013)	Rush (2013)	The Amazing Spider-Man 2 (2014)

Rush is the soundtrack to the film of the same name, released on 10 September 10 2013. The soundtrack features a musical score composed and arranged by Hans Zimmer, plus five classic rock songs by Dave Edmunds, Steve Winwood, Mud, Thin Lizzy, and David Bowie.

== Track listing ==
All tracks are written by Hans Zimmer, except where indicated.

No.	Title	Writer(s)	Artist	Length
1.	"1976"			3:00
2.	"I Could Show You If You'd Like"			0:46
3.	"I Hear You Knocking"	Dave Bartholomew	Dave Edmunds	2:49
4.	"Stopwatch"			1:31
5.	"Into the Red"			3:16
6.	"Budgie"			1:28
7.	"Scuderia"			0:55
8.	"Gimme Some Lovin'"	Steve Winwood; Spencer Davis; Muff Winwood	Steve Winwood	2:59
9.	"Oysters in the Pits"			1:06
10.	"20%"			1:02
11.	"Dyna-mite"	Mike Chapman; Nicky Chinn	Mud	2:58
12.	"Watkins Glen"			1:51
13.	"Loose Cannon"			0:37
14.	"The Rocker"	Phil Lynott; Brian Downey; Eric Bell	Thin Lizzy	5:16
15.	"Car Trouble"			2:38
16.	"Glück"			1:14
17.	"Nürburgring"			5:35
18.	"Inferno"			3:32
19.	"Mount Fuji"			3:45
20.	"For Love"			2:50
21.	"Reign"			3:07
22.	"Fame"	David Bowie; Carlos Alomar; John Lennon	David Bowie	4:18
23.	"Lost but Won"			6:18
24.	"My Best Enemy"			2:34
Total length:				65:06

Music appearing in the film and trailers and not included on the soundtrack

#	Title	Performer(s)
1	"Mama Weer All Crazee Now"	Slade
2	"Sono Una Donna, Non Sono Una Santa"	Rosanna Fratello
3	"Sad Sweet Dreamer"	Sweet Sensation
4	"Many Rivers to Cross"	Jimmy Cliff
5	"Ê Baiana"	Clara Nunes
6	"I Can't Stop"	Flux Pavilion
