= Carol Rusche Bentel =

American architect

Carol Rusche Bentel was born in St. Louis, Missouri. Architect and educator, Bentel is partner of architectural firm Bentel & Bentel Architects/Planners AIA and is the BFA Interior Design: Built Environments, School of Visual Arts chair.

She holds a BA at Washington University in St. Louis and a M.Arch. at North Carolina State University. Bentel received her PhD in the History, Theory, and Criticism of Modern Architecture at MIT. She was awarded a Fulbright scholarship at the University of Venice (Italy). Bentel was also the national chair on the AIA Committee on Design in 2008 and a Fellow of the American Academy in Rome.

Bentel has taught at Harvard, MIT, Georgia Tech, the Architectural Association in London, and lectured at the Centro Palladio in Vicenza (Italy), among other institutions. She is co-author of Nourishing the Senses: Restaurant Architecture of Bentel and Bentel and has published numerous articles on Italian Modernism.

== Professional experience ==
The Architects Collaborative, Cambridge, MA

Hisaka & Associates, Cambridge, MA

Isozaki Studio, Japan

Bentel and Bentel Architects, NY - Partner

== Professional affiliations ==
Elected to the College of Fellows, American Institute of Architects, 2003

Elected to IIDA College of Fellows, 2020

Elected to the ASID College of Fellows in 2024.

Preservation League of NYS, Vice Chair, 2020

American Institute of Architects, National AIA Committee on Design, National Chair, 2008; Carol Bentel was responsible for three major conferences for the National AIA Committee on Design with a focus on 20th Century Architecture:

Rome (2001): Modern Currents along the Tiber

Denmark (2008): Danish Modern – Then & Now

Detroit (2008): Design Parallels

== Written work and lectures ==
=== Written work ===
Dr. Carol Bentel, Dr. Paul Bentel, and Peter Bentel; John Morris Dixon, ed. Nourishing the Senses: Restaurant Architecture of Bentel and Bentel (VPB, 2018)

“I tre siti per il Foro Fascista” in Giorgio Ciucci (ed.), Classicism Classicismi: Architettura Europa/America 1920-1940, (Electa, 1995): 145-150. [Italian text]

“1934, Progetto di concorso di primo grado per il Palazzo del littorio a Roma. Progetti A e B,” “1937, Progetto di concorso di secondo grado per il Palazzo del littorio a Roma,” “1937-1939, “Casa del fascio di Lissone,” in Giorgio Ciucci (ed.), Giuseppe Terragni (Electa, 1996). [Three chapters written by author in Italian]

“Book Review of Building New Communities by Diane Ghirardo,” JSAH (December, 1992): 447-8.

“Der Wettbewerb fuer den Palazzo Littorio im Jahre 1934: Projekt A und Projekt B,“ in Stefan Germer and Achim Preib (ed.), Giuseppe Terragni 1904-1943 (Munich, 1991).

"The Palazzo del Littorio Competition," Architecture Today, Vol. 3, 1989. London, England.

Carol R. Bentel & Alan Cobb, Design Parallels, Albert Kahn Family of Companies, Detroit, 2008.

Carol R. Bentel & T. Gunny Harboe, Danish Modern: Then and Now, Kahn Family of Companies, Detroit, 2008.

=== Lectures ===
“Storia e conservazione dell’architettura contemporanea: consulto sulla Casa del Fasio di Como di Giuseppe Terragni.” Centro Internazionale di Studi di Archittura Andrea Palladio, in collaboration with Centro Studi Giuseppe Terragni, Como, April 2–5, 1998. [Lecture in Italian]

“Terragni,” Centro Internazionale di Studi di Architettura Andrea Palladio, Vicenza, June 20-15, 1994. [Lecture in Italian]

“The Typology of the Casa del Fascio,” CAA Session “Art, Architecture, and Art History, and the Modern Totalitarian State, Seattle, 1993.

“Le Case del Fascio,” Lecture at the American Academy in Rome, June 2, 1994.

“Bentel & Bentel Architects,” Lecture at the American Academy in Rome, Spring, 1994.

“2+2: Achieving Outstanding Design,” 2015 AIA National Convention, May, 2015 (Selected by AIA College of Fellows)

Lecture, "What is a Casa del Fascio?" School of Architecture, Yale University, February 20, 1990.

Lecture, “The Work of Bentel & Bentel,” Washington University, Distinguished Alumni Series, 2005.

“Bentel & Bentel Architects,” Monday Lecture Series, Webb Institute (Naval Architecture), April 8, 2013

“Nourishing the Senses: Restaurant Architecture of Bentel & Bentel,” AIA Beijing, AIA Hong Kong, China, December 2017

“Mediterràneo,” Conference at the Architectural Association, 1989.

== Recognition ==
Bentel has numerous local, national, and international design awards beginning with the winning prize for the 1985 New York Times Square Competition (with Dr. Paul Bentel FAIA) displayed in The Skyscraper Museum (2014-2015), to the international award from the London magazine “Wallpaper” for the best restaurant design in the world for The Modern restaurant at MoMA in NYC (with Dr. Paul Bentel FAIA & Peter Bentel AIA).

The awards include four National AIA Honor Awards, numerous SARA awards, “Best Design of the Year 2000,” IIDA and Interior Design Magazine Award, 2007 HD Platinum Circle Honoree, three James Beard Awards for design, and two winning entries (interiors) in Built by Women NYC, 2015. Work has been published in numerous publications including “Architectural Record,” “Interior Design,” “Hospitality Design,” and “Metropolis.”

== Publications ==
“Dr. Bentel tackles the issue of Disposable Design at Design Talks 2019,” by Donna Heiderstadt, Interior Design Magazine, May 16, 2019

“Carol Bentel, New York City College of Technology," Hospitality Design Magazine, Education Issue, September, 2014, p. 131

Annie Block, “A Sea Change: Paul & Carol Bentel reinvent New York’s Le Bernardin for Eric Ripert,” Interior Design, Jan. 2012, 41-44

Emily Hooper, “Bentel & Bentel Architects/Planners,” Contract Design, Jan.-Feb. 2013, 74-77.

Fred Bernstein, “Makeover at Grand Hyatt Sheds the Trump Glitter,” The New York Times, Jan.11, 2011.

“Women of Influence,” Hospitality Design, July 2010.

Suzanne LaBarre, “Unsung Heroes,” Metropolis (April 2009): 80-88, 101.

Alexandra Lange,” Modern Mediation,” in Metropolis (June 2005): 182-187ff.

== See also ==
- Maria Bentel
