= Tanca =

French Roman Catholic saint

Saint Tanca (died 637) is the name of a sixth-century French Roman Catholic saint.

Tanca was born in Troyes, France. She was killed while defending her virginity when attacked by a servant. She is considered to be a martyr. Her cultus dates from the early 7th century. Her feast day is celebrated October 10.

== Bibliography ==
- catholic.org
