= Rush Township =

Rush Township may refer to:

== Illinois ==
- Rush Township, Illinois

== Michigan ==
- Rush Township, Shiawassee County, Michigan

== Missouri ==
- Rush Township, Buchanan County, Missouri

== Ohio ==
- Rush Township, Champaign County, Ohio
- Rush Township, Scioto County, Ohio
- Rush Township, Tuscarawas County, Ohio

== Pennsylvania ==
- Rush Township, Centre County, Pennsylvania
- Rush Township, Dauphin County, Pennsylvania
- Rush Township, Northumberland County, Pennsylvania
- Rush Township, Schuylkill County, Pennsylvania
- Rush Township, Susquehanna County, Pennsylvania
