= Victoria Wright =

Victoria Wright may refer to:

- Victoria Wright (badminton)
- Victoria Wright (banker)
