= Victoria Wright (banker) =

Native American writer and banker

Victoria Wright is a Wampanoag-American writer, author, speaker, voice over artist, and creator whose early career was in the finance industry.

== Family and education ==
Victoria Wright is originally from Martha's Vineyard, Massachusetts. She is multi-racial but was raised Native American. She is a member of the Wampanoag Tribe of Gay Head Aquinnah. Today, she and her family live outside of Denver in Englewood, Colorado.

== Career ==
Wright began her career in finance, where she was a member of Merrill Lynch’s Wealth Management Group's Native American Professional Network. Later, she worked at Bank of America as the Strategic Marketing Executive, Chief Administrative Officer Group at Bank of America.

At the beginning of the pandemic, she retired from finance to pursue writing. She began writing her first book at the age of 56.

The Quiet Butterfly is a young-adult novel. The story follows Neepa, a Black Native American teenager who gets bullied at school for not fitting in. The reader learns a bully has less impact when we trust ourselves and stop worrying about what others think of us.

== Publications ==
- The Quiet Butterfly
