= Battle of Britain =

1940 World War II military campaign

- Part of the Western Front of World War II
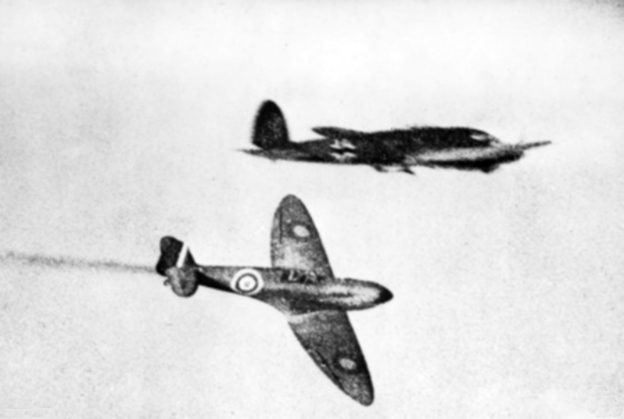
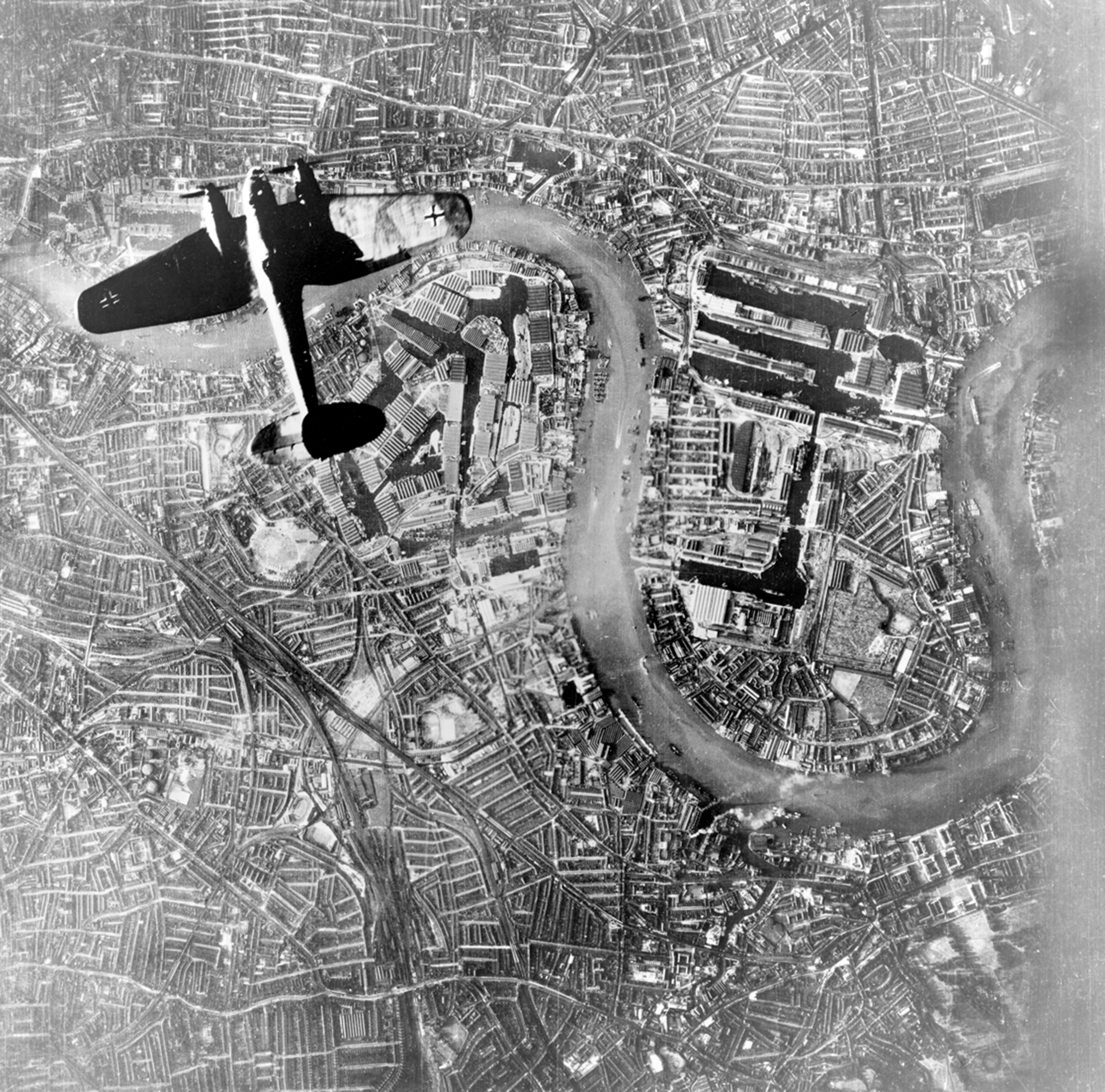
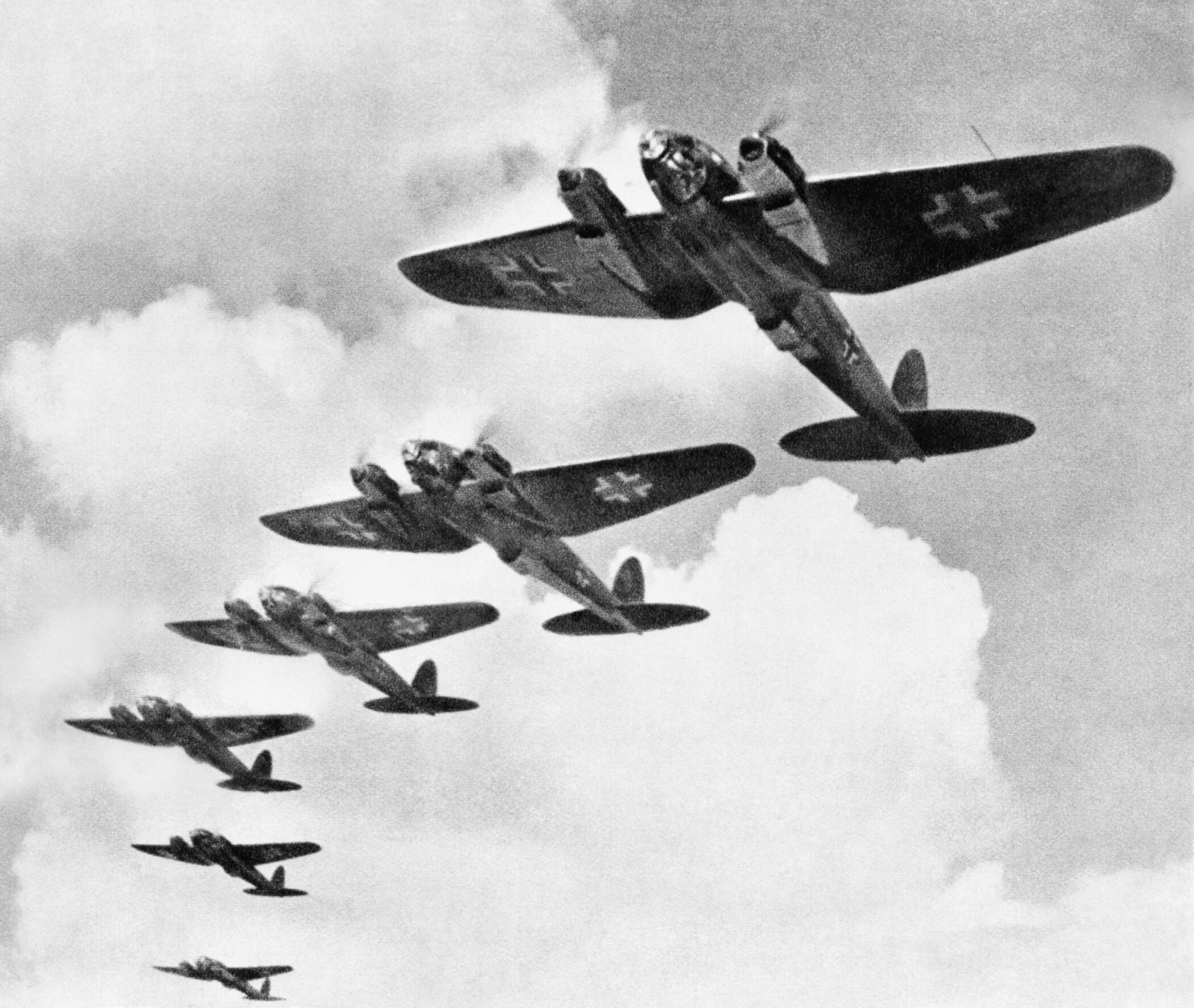
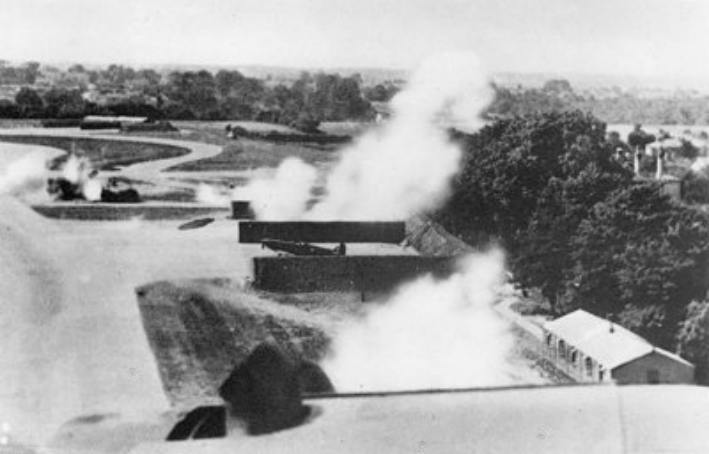
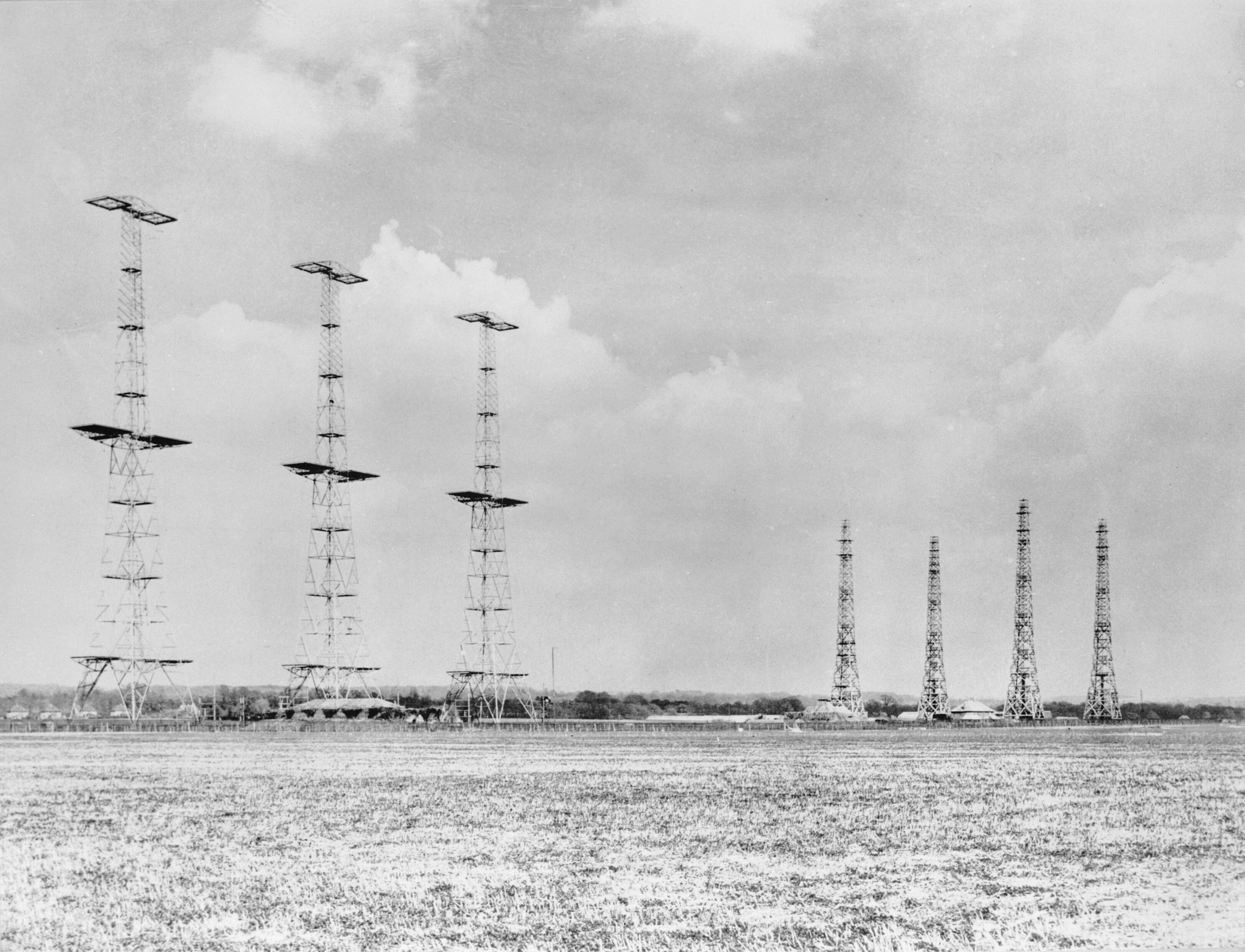
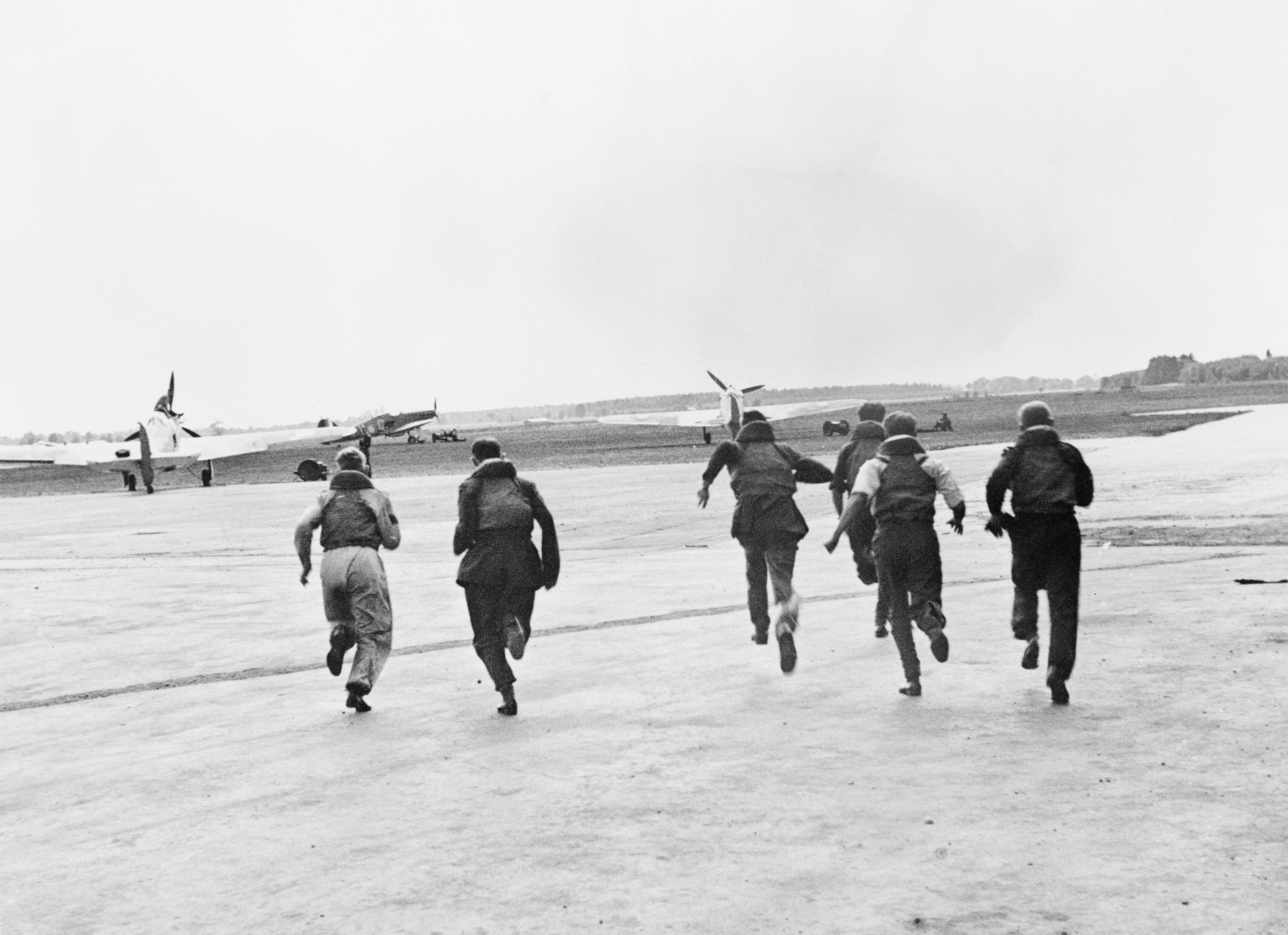
- From top to bottom, left to right: British Spitfire intercepts a German bomber; German Heinkel He111s over the Isle of Dogs, London; Formation of German Heinkel He 111s; Royal Air Force station under attack; Chain Home radar station on the south coast; RAF pilots scramble to their aircraft during the battle
Date	10 July – 31 October 1940 (Note: The British date the battle from 10 July to 31 October 1940, which represented one of the most intense period of daylight bombing. German historians usually place the beginning of the battle in July 1940 and end it mid-May 1941, with the withdrawal of the bomber units in support for Operation Barbarossa, the campaign against the Soviet Union, which began on 22 June 1941.) (3 months and 3 weeks)
Location	British airspace, English Channel
Result	British victory

Belligerents
United Kingdom; Canada	Germany; Italy

Commanders and leaders
Hugh Dowding; Keith Park; Trafford Leigh-Mallory; Quintin Brand; Richard Saul	Hermann Göring; Albert Kesselring; Hugo Sperrle; Hans-Jürgen Stumpff; Rino Fougier

Units involved
Royal Air Force (Note: The Polish, Czech and most other national contingents were incorporated into the RAF. The Polish Air Force was not given sovereignty until June 1944.); Royal Navy; Fleet Air Arm; Royal Canadian Air Force (Note: Although under RAF operational control, RCAF pilots during the battle were flying for the RCAF. Although Canada sent their squadrons to Britain, countries like Australia and New Zealand did not.)	Luftwaffe; Corpo Aereo Italiano

Strength
1,963 aircraft (Note: 754 single-seat fighters, 149 two-seat fighters, 560 bombers and 500 coastal aircraft. The RAF fighter strength given is for 09:00 1 July 1940, while bomber strength is for 11 July 1940.)	2,550 aircraft (Note: Figures taken from Quartermaster General 6th Battalion returns on 10 August 1940. According to these, the Luftwaffe deployed 3,358 aircraft against Britain, of which 2,550 were serviceable. The force was made up of 934 single-seat fighters, 289 two-seat fighters, 1,482 medium bombers, 327 dive-bombers, 195 reconnaissance and 93 coastal aircraft, including unserviceable aircraft. The number of serviceable aircraft amounted to 805 single-seat fighters, 224 two-seat fighters, 998 medium bombers, 261 dive-bombers, 151 reconnaissance and 80 coastal aircraft.) (Note: The Luftwaffe possessed 4,074 aircraft, but not all of these were deployed against Britain. The force was made up of 1,107 single-seat fighters, 357 two-seat fighters, 1,380 medium bombers, 428 dive-bombers, and 569 reconnaissance and 233 coastal aircraft, including unserviceable aircraft. The Luftwaffe air strength given is from the Quartermaster General 6th Battalion numbers for 29 June 1940.)

Casualties and losses
1,542 killed (Note: 544 aircrew (RAF Fighter Command), 718 (RAF Bomber Command), 280 (RAF Coastal Command) killed); 422 wounded; 1,744 aircraft destroyed (Note: 1,220 fighters (753 Hurricane, 467 Spitfire) 376 bombers, 148 aircraft (RAF Coastal Command))	2,585 killed; 735 wounded; 925 captured; 1,977 aircraft destroyed (Note: 812 fighters (per type: 569 Bf 109, 243 Bf 110) 822 bombers (per type: 65 Ju 87, 271 Ju 88, 184 Do 17, 223 He 111, 29 He 59, 24 He 159, 34 others) 343 non-combat (per type: 76 Bf 109, 29 Bf 110, 25 Ju 87, 54 Ju 88, 31 Do 17, 66 He 111, 7 He 59, 7 He 159, 48 others))
- 23,002 civilians killed 32,138 civilians wounded

The Battle of Britain (German: Luftschlacht um England, lit. 'air battle for England') was a military campaign of the Second World War, in which the Royal Air Force (RAF) and the Fleet Air Arm (FAA) of the Royal Navy defended the United Kingdom against large-scale attacks by Nazi Germany's air force, the Luftwaffe. It was the first major military campaign fought entirely by air forces. It takes its name from the speech given by Prime Minister Winston Churchill to the House of Commons on 18 June 1940: "What General Weygand called the 'Battle of France' is over. I expect that the Battle of Britain is about to begin."

The Germans had rapidly overwhelmed France and the Low Countries in the Battle of France, leaving Britain to face the threat of invasion by sea. The German high command recognised the difficulties of a seaborne attack while the Royal Navy controlled the English Channel and the North Sea. The primary objective of the German forces was to compel Britain to agree to a negotiated peace settlement.

The British officially recognise the battle's duration as being from 10 July until 31 October 1940, which overlaps the period of large-scale night attacks known as the Blitz, that lasted from 7 September 1940 to 11 May 1941. German historians do not follow this subdivision and regard the battle as a single campaign lasting from July 1940 to May 1941, including the Blitz.

In July 1940, the air and sea blockade began, with the Luftwaffe mainly targeting coastal-shipping convoys, as well as ports and shipping centres such as Portsmouth. On 16 July, Hitler ordered the preparation of Operation Sea Lion as a potential amphibious and airborne assault on Britain, to follow once the Luftwaffe had air superiority over the Channel. On 1 August, the Luftwaffe was directed to achieve air superiority over the RAF, with the aim of incapacitating RAF Fighter Command; 12 days later, it shifted the attacks to RAF airfields and infrastructure. As the battle progressed, the Luftwaffe also targeted factories involved in aircraft production and strategic infrastructure. Eventually, it employed terror bombing on areas of political significance and on civilians. (Note: The strategic bombing commenced after the Germans bombed London on 14 September 1940, followed by the RAF bombing of Berlin and of German air force bases in France. Adolf Hitler withdrew his directive not to bomb population centres and ordered attacks on British cities.) In September, RAF Bomber Command night raids disrupted the German preparation of converted barges, and the Luftwaffe's failure to overwhelm the RAF forced Hitler to postpone and eventually cancel Operation Sea Lion. The Luftwaffe proved unable to sustain daylight raids, but their continued night-bombing operations on Britain became known as the Blitz.

Germany's failure to destroy Britain's air defences and force it out of the conflict was the first major German defeat in the Second World War.

== Background ==
Strategic bombing during World War I introduced air attacks intended to panic civilian targets and led in 1918 to the merger of the British army and navy air services into the Royal Air Force (RAF). Its first Chief of the Air Staff, Hugh Trenchard, was among the military strategists in the 1920s, like Giulio Douhet, who saw air warfare as a new way to overcome the bloody stalemate of trench warfare. Interception was expected to be nearly impossible, with fighter planes no faster than bombers. Their slogan was that the bomber will always get through, and that the only defence was a deterrent bomber force capable of matching retaliation. Predictions were made that a bomber offensive would quickly cause thousands of deaths and civilian hysteria leading to capitulation. However, widespread pacifism following the horrors of the First World War contributed to a reluctance to provide resources.

=== Developing air strategies ===
Germany was forbidden a military air force by the 1919 Treaty of Versailles, and therefore air crew were trained by means of civilian and sport flying. Following a 1923 memorandum, the Deutsche Luft Hansa airline developed designs for aircraft such as the Junkers Ju 52, which could carry passengers and freight, but also be readily adapted into a bomber. In 1926, the secret Lipetsk fighter-pilot school began training Germans in the Soviet Union. Erhard Milch organised rapid expansion, and following the 1933 Nazi seizure of power, his subordinate Robert Knauss formulated a deterrence theory incorporating Douhet's ideas and Tirpitz's "risk theory". This proposed a fleet of heavy bombers to deter a preventive attack by France and Poland before Germany could fully rearm. A 1933–34 war game indicated a need for fighters and anti-aircraft protection as well as bombers. On 1 March 1935, the Luftwaffe was formally announced, with Walther Wever as Chief of Staff. The 1935 Luftwaffe doctrine for "Conduct of Air War" (Luftkriegführung) set air power within the overall military strategy, with critical tasks of attaining (local and temporary) air superiority and providing battlefield support for army and naval forces. Strategic bombing of industries and transport could be decisive longer-term options, dependent on opportunity or preparations by the army and navy. It could be used to overcome a stalemate, or used when only destruction of the enemy's economy would be conclusive. The list excluded bombing civilians to destroy homes or undermine morale, as that was considered a waste of strategic effort, but the doctrine allowed revenge attacks if German civilians were bombed. A revised edition was issued in 1940, and the continuing central principle of Luftwaffe doctrine was that the destruction of enemy armed forces was of primary importance.

The RAF responded to Luftwaffe developments with its 1934 Expansion Plan A rearmament scheme, and in 1936 it was restructured into Bomber Command, Coastal Command, Training Command and Fighter Command. The last was under Hugh Dowding, who opposed the doctrine that bombers were unstoppable: the invention of radar at that time could allow early detection, and prototype monoplane fighters were significantly faster. Priorities were disputed, but in December 1937, the Minister in charge of Defence Coordination, Sir Thomas Inskip, sided with Dowding that "The role of our air force is not an early knock-out blow" but rather was "to prevent the Germans from knocking us out" and fighter squadrons were just as necessary as bomber squadrons.

The Spanish Civil War (1936–1939) gave the Luftwaffe Condor Legion the opportunity to test air fighting tactics with their new aeroplanes. Wolfram von Richthofen became an exponent of air power providing ground support to other services. The difficulty of accurately hitting targets prompted Ernst Udet to require that all new bombers had to be dive bombers, and led to the development of the Knickebein system for night time navigation. Priority was given to producing large numbers of smaller aeroplanes, and plans for a long-range, four-engined strategic bomber were cancelled.

=== First stages of the Second World War ===
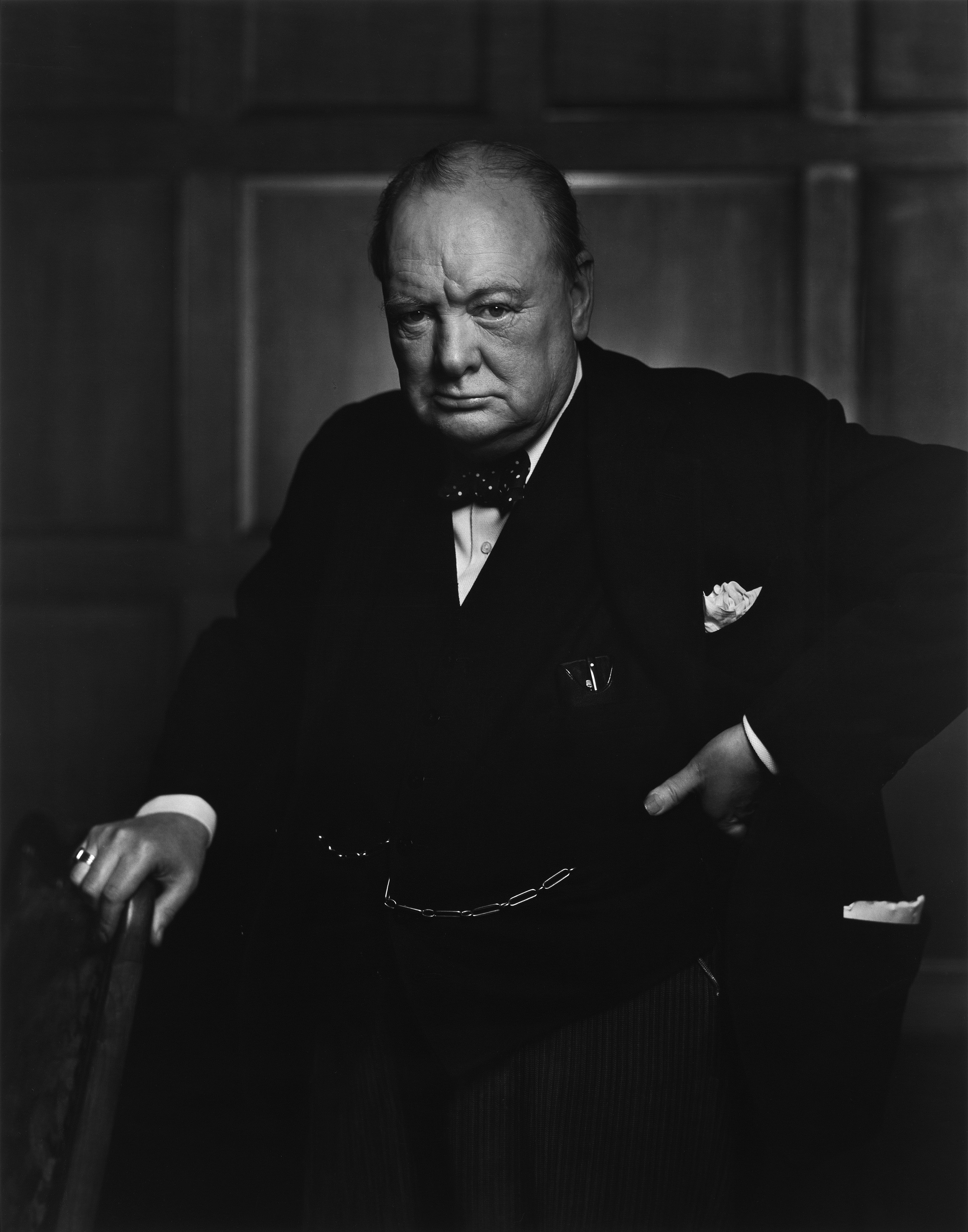
Winston Churchill, British Prime Minister, in 1941. Photograph by Karsh of Ottawa

The early stages of the Second World War saw successful German invasions on the continent, aided decisively by the air power of the Luftwaffe, which was able to establish tactical air superiority with great effectiveness. The speed with which German forces defeated most of the defending armies in Norway in early 1940 created a significant political crisis in Britain. In early May 1940, the Norway Debate questioned the fitness for office of the British Prime Minister Neville Chamberlain. On 10 May, the same day Winston Churchill became British Prime Minister, the Germans initiated the Battle of France with an aggressive invasion of French territory. RAF Fighter Command was desperately short of trained pilots and aircraft. Churchill sent fighter squadrons, the Air Component of the British Expeditionary Force, to support operations in France, where the RAF suffered heavy losses. This was despite the objections of its commander Hugh Dowding that the diversion of his forces would leave home defences under-strength.

After the evacuation of British and French soldiers from Dunkirk and the French surrender on 22 June 1940, Hitler mainly focused his energies on the possibility of invading the Soviet Union. He believed that the British, defeated on the continent and without European allies, would quickly come to terms. The Germans were so convinced of an imminent armistice that they began constructing street decorations for the homecoming parades of victorious troops. Although the British Foreign Secretary, Lord Halifax, and certain elements of the British public favoured a negotiated peace with an ascendant Germany, Churchill and a majority of his Cabinet refused to consider an armistice. Instead, Churchill used his skilful rhetoric to harden public opinion against capitulation and prepare the British for a long war.

The Battle of Britain has the unusual distinction that it gained its name before being fought. The name is derived from the This was their finest hour speech delivered by Winston Churchill in the House of Commons on 18 June, more than three weeks prior to the generally accepted date for the start of the battle:

... What General Weygand called the Battle of France is over. I expect that the battle of Britain is about to begin. Upon this battle depends the survival of Christian civilization. Upon it depends our own British life and the long continuity of our institutions and our Empire. The whole fury and might of the enemy must very soon be turned on us. Hitler knows that he will have to break us in this island or lose the war. If we can stand up to him, all Europe may be free and the life of the world may move forward into broad, sunlit uplands. But if we fail, then the whole world, including the United States, including all that we have known and cared for, will sink into the abyss of a new Dark Age made more sinister, and perhaps more protracted, by the lights of a perverted science. Let us therefore brace ourselves to our duties, and so bear ourselves that, if the British Empire and its Commonwealth last for a thousand years, men will still say, "This was their finest hour".

— Winston Churchill

=== German aims and directives ===
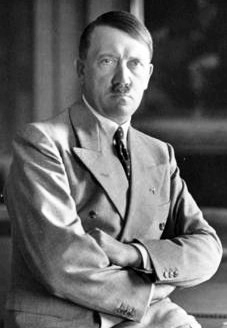
Adolf Hitler in 1936

From the outset of his rise to power, Adolf Hitler expressed admiration for Britain, and throughout the Battle period he sought neutrality or a peace treaty with Britain. In a secret conference on 23 May 1939, Hitler set out his rather contradictory strategy that an attack on Poland was essential and "will only be successful if the Western Powers keep out of it. If this is impossible, then it will be better to attack in the West and to settle Poland at the same time" with a surprise attack. "If Holland and Belgium are successfully occupied and held, and if France is also defeated, the fundamental conditions for a successful war against England will have been secured. England can then be blockaded from Western France at close quarters by the Air Force, while the Navy with its submarines extend the range of the blockade."

When war commenced, Hitler and the OKW (Oberkommando der Wehrmacht or "High Command of the Armed Forces") issued a series of directives ordering, planning and stating strategic objectives. "Directive No. 1 for the Conduct of the War", dated 31 August 1939, instructed the invasion of Poland on 1 September as planned. Potentially, Luftwaffe "operations against England" were to:

dislocate English imports, the armaments industry, and the transport of troops to France. Any favourable opportunity of an effective attack on concentrated units of the English Navy, particularly on battleships or aircraft carriers, will be exploited. The decision regarding attacks on London is reserved to me. Attacks on the English homeland are to be prepared, bearing in mind that inconclusive results with insufficient forces are to be avoided in all circumstances.

Both France and the UK declared war on Germany; on 9 October, Hitler's "Directive No. 6" planned the offensive to defeat these allies and "win as much territory as possible in the Netherlands, Belgium, and northern France to serve as a base for the successful prosecution of the air and sea war against England". On 29 November, OKW "Directive No. 9 – Instructions For Warfare Against The Economy Of The Enemy" stated that once this coastline had been secured, the Luftwaffe together with the Kriegsmarine (German Navy) was to blockade UK ports with sea mines. They were to attack shipping and warships and make air attacks on shore installations and industrial production. This directive remained in force in the first phase of the Battle of Britain. It was reinforced on 24 May during the Battle of France by "Directive No. 13", which authorised the Luftwaffe "to attack the English homeland in the fullest manner, as soon as sufficient forces are available. This attack will be opened by an annihilating reprisal for English attacks on the Ruhr Basin."

By the end of June 1940, Germany had defeated Britain's allies on the continent, and on 30 June the OKW Chief of Staff, Alfred Jodl, issued his review of options to increase pressure on Britain to agree to a negotiated peace, such as a cross-Channel invasion or attacks on Britain's periphery strongholds in the Mediterranean such as Gibraltar, Malta and the Suez Canal. In the case of the first option, the main priority was to eliminate the RAF and gain air supremacy. Intensified air attacks against shipping and the economy could affect food supplies and civilian morale in the long term. Reprisal attacks of terror bombing had the potential to cause quicker capitulation, but the effect on morale was uncertain. On the same day, the Luftwaffe Commander-in-Chief, Hermann Göring issued his operational directive: to destroy the RAF, thus protecting German industry, and also to block overseas supplies to Britain. The German Supreme Command argued over the practicality of these options.

In "Directive No. 16 – On preparations for a landing operation against England" on 16 July, Hitler required readiness by mid-August for the possibility of an invasion he called Operation Sea Lion, unless the British agreed to negotiations. The Luftwaffe reported that it would be ready to launch its major attack early in August. The Kriegsmarine Commander-in-Chief, Grand Admiral Erich Raeder, continued to highlight the impracticality of these plans and said sea invasion could not take place before early 1941. Hitler now argued that Britain was holding out in hope of assistance from Russia, and the Soviet Union was to be invaded by mid 1941. Göring met his air fleet commanders, and on 24 July issued "Tasks and Goals" of firstly gaining air supremacy, secondly protecting invasion forces and attacking the Royal Navy's ships. Thirdly, they were to blockade imports, bombing harbours and stores of supplies.

Hitler's "Directive No. 17 – For the conduct of air and sea warfare against England" issued on 1 August attempted to keep all the options open. The Luftwaffe's Adlertag campaign was to start around 5 August, subject to weather, with the aim of gaining air superiority over southern England as a necessary precondition of invasion, to give credibility to the threat and give Hitler the option of ordering the invasion. The intention was to incapacitate the RAF so much that the UK would feel open to air attack, and would begin peace negotiations. It was also to isolate the UK and damage war production, beginning an effective blockade. Following severe Luftwaffe losses, Hitler agreed at a 14 September OKW conference that the air campaign was to intensify regardless of invasion plans. On 16 September, Göring gave the order for this change in strategy, to the first independent strategic bombing campaign.

==== Negotiated peace or neutrality ====
Hitler's 1925 book Mein Kampf mostly set out his hatreds: he only admired ordinary German World War I soldiers and Britain, which he saw as an ally against communism. In 1935 Hermann Göring welcomed news that Britain, as a potential ally, was rearming. In 1936 he promised assistance to defend the British Empire, asking only a free hand in Eastern Europe, and repeated this to Lord Halifax in 1937. That year, von Ribbentrop met Churchill with a similar proposal; when rebuffed, he told Churchill that interference with German domination would mean war. To Hitler's great annoyance, all his diplomacy failed to stop Britain from declaring war when he invaded Poland. During the fall of France, he repeatedly discussed peace efforts with his generals.

When Churchill came to power, there was still wide support for Halifax, who as Foreign Secretary openly argued for peace negotiations in the tradition of British diplomacy, to secure British independence without war. On 20 May, Halifax secretly requested a Swedish businessman to make contact with Göring to open negotiations. Shortly afterwards, in the May 1940 War Cabinet Crisis, Halifax argued for negotiations involving the Italians, but this was rejected by Churchill with majority support. An approach made through the Swedish ambassador on 22 June was reported to Hitler, making peace negotiations seem feasible. Throughout July, as the battle started, the Germans made wider attempts to find a diplomatic solution. On 2 July, the day the armed forces were asked to start preliminary planning for an invasion, Hitler got von Ribbentrop to draft a speech offering peace negotiations. On 19 July Hitler made this speech to the German Parliament in Berlin, appealing "to reason and common sense", and said he could "see no reason why this war should go on". His sombre conclusion was received in silence, but he did not suggest negotiations and this was perceived as being effectively an ultimatum by the British government, which rejected the offer. Halifax kept trying to arrange peace until he was sent to Washington in December as ambassador, and in January 1941 Hitler expressed continued interest in negotiating peace with Britain.

==== Blockade and siege ====
A May 1939 planning exercise by Luftflotte 3 found that the Luftwaffe lacked the means to do much damage to Britain's war economy beyond laying naval mines. Joseph Schmid, in charge of Luftwaffe intelligence, presented a report on 22 November 1939, stating that, "Of all Germany's possible enemies, Britain is the most dangerous." This "Proposal for the Conduct of Air Warfare" argued for a counter to the British blockade and said "Key is to paralyse the British trade". Instead of the Wehrmacht attacking the French, the Luftwaffe with naval assistance was to block imports to Britain and attack seaports. "Should the enemy resort to terror measures – for example, to attack our towns in western Germany" they could retaliate by bombing industrial centres and London. Parts of this appeared on 29 November in "Directive No. 9" as future actions once the coast had been conquered. On 24 May 1940 "Directive No. 13" authorised attacks on the blockade targets, as well as retaliation for RAF bombing of industrial targets in the Ruhr.

After the defeat of France, the OKW felt they had won the war, and some more pressure would persuade Britain to give in. On 30 June, the OKW Chief of Staff Alfred Jodl issued his paper setting out options: the first was to increase attacks on shipping, economic targets and the RAF: air attacks and food shortages were expected to break morale and lead to capitulation. Destruction of the RAF was the first priority, and invasion would be a last resort. Göring's operational directive issued the same day ordered the destruction of the RAF to clear the way for attacks cutting off seaborne supplies to Britain. It made no mention of invasion.

==== Invasion plans ====
In November 1939, the OKW reviewed the potential for an air- and seaborne invasion of Britain: the Kriegsmarine was faced with the threat the Royal Navy's larger Home Fleet posed to a crossing of the English Channel, and together with the German Army viewed control of airspace as a necessary precondition. The German navy thought air superiority alone was insufficient; the German naval staff had already produced a study (in 1939) on the possibility of an invasion of Britain and concluded that it also required naval superiority. The Luftwaffe said invasion could only be "the final act in an already victorious war."

Hitler first discussed the idea of an invasion at a 21 May 1940 meeting with Grand Admiral Erich Raeder, who stressed the difficulties and his own preference for a blockade. OKW Chief of Staff Jodl's 30 June report described invasion as a last resort once the British economy had been damaged and the Luftwaffe had full air superiority. On 2 July, OKW requested preliminary plans.

In Britain, Churchill described "the great invasion scare" as "serving a very useful purpose" by "keeping every man and woman tuned to a high pitch of readiness". Historian Len Deighton stated that on 10 July Churchill advised the War Cabinet that invasion could be ignored, as it "would be a most hazardous and suicidal operation".

On 11 July, Hitler agreed with Raeder that invasion would be a last resort, and the Luftwaffe advised that gaining air superiority would take 14 to 28 days. Hitler met his army chiefs, von Brauchitsch and Halder, at the Berchtesgaden Obersalzberg on 13 July where they presented detailed plans on the assumption that the navy would provide safe transport. Von Brauchitsch and Halder were surprised that Hitler took no interest in the invasion plans, unlike his usual attitude toward military operations, but on 16 July he issued Directive No. 16, ordering preparations for Operation Sea Lion.

The navy insisted on a narrow beachhead and an extended period for landing troops; the army rejected these plans: the Luftwaffe could begin an air attack in August. Hitler held a meeting of his army and navy chiefs on 31 July. The navy said 22 September was the earliest possible date and proposed postponement until the following year, but Hitler preferred September. He then told von Brauchitsch and Halder that he would decide on the landing operation eight to fourteen days after the air attack began. On 1 August, he issued Directive No. 17 for intensified air and sea warfare, to begin with Adlertag on or after 5 August, subject to weather, keeping options open for negotiated peace or blockade and siege.

==== Independent air attack ====
Under the continuing influence of the 1935 "Conduct of the Air War" doctrine, the main focus of the Luftwaffe command (including Göring) was in concentrating attacks to destroy enemy armed forces on the battlefield, and "blitzkrieg" close air support of the army succeeded brilliantly. They reserved strategic bombing for a stalemate situation or revenge attacks, but doubted if this could be decisive on its own and regarded bombing civilians to destroy homes or undermine morale as a waste of strategic effort.

The defeat of France in June 1940 introduced the prospect for the first time of independent air action against Britain. A July Fliegercorps I paper asserted that Germany was by definition an air power: "Its chief weapon against England is the Air Force, then the Navy, followed by the landing forces and the Army." In 1940, the Luftwaffe would undertake a "strategic offensive ... on its own and independent of the other services", according to an April 1944 German account of their military mission. Göring was convinced that strategic bombing could win objectives that were beyond the army and navy, and gain political advantages in the Third Reich for the Luftwaffe and himself. He expected air warfare to decisively force Britain to negotiate, as all in the OKW hoped, and the Luftwaffe took little interest in planning to support an invasion.

== Opposing forces ==
The Luftwaffe faced a more capable opponent than any it had previously met: a sizeable, highly coordinated, well-supplied, modern air force.

=== Fighters ===
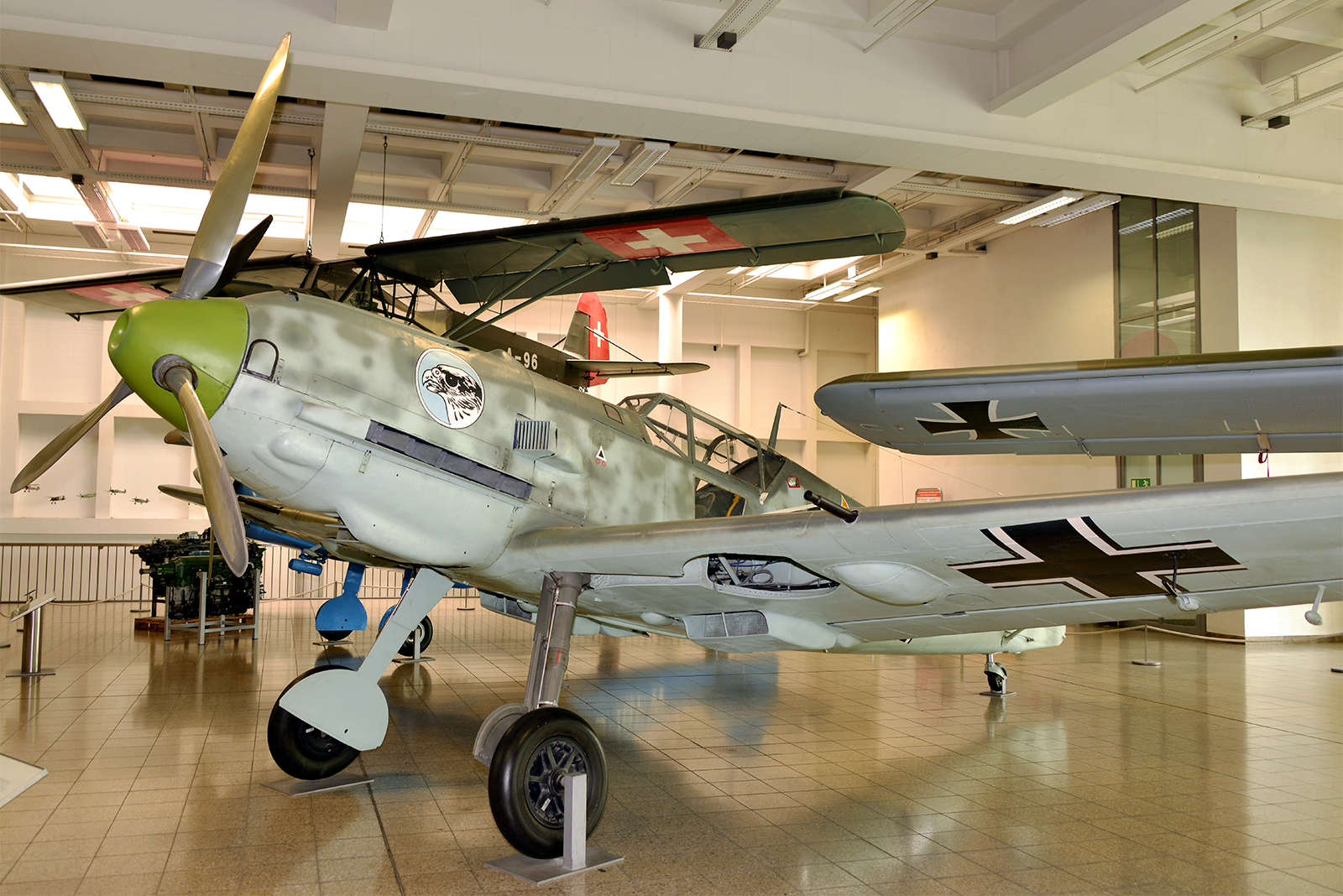
Messerschmitt Bf 109E-3 at the Deutsches Museum in Munich

The Luftwaffe's Messerschmitt Bf 109E and Bf 110C fought against the RAF's workhorse Hurricane Mk I and the less numerous Spitfire Mk I; Hurricanes outnumbered Spitfires in RAF Fighter Command by about 2:1 when war broke out. The Bf 109E had a better climb rate and was up to 40 mph faster in level flight than the Rotol (constant speed propeller) equipped Hurricane Mk I, depending on altitude. The speed and climb disparity with the original non-Rotol Hurricane was even greater. By mid-1940, all RAF Spitfire and Hurricane fighter squadrons converted to 100 octane aviation fuel, which allowed their Merlin engines to generate significantly more power and an approximately 30 mph increase in speed at low altitudes through the use of an Emergency Boost Override. In September 1940, the more powerful Mk IIa series 1 Hurricanes started entering service in small numbers. This version was capable of a maximum speed of 342 mph (550 km/h), some 20 mph more than the original (non-Rotol) Mk I, though it was still 15 to 20 mph slower than a Bf 109 (depending on altitude).

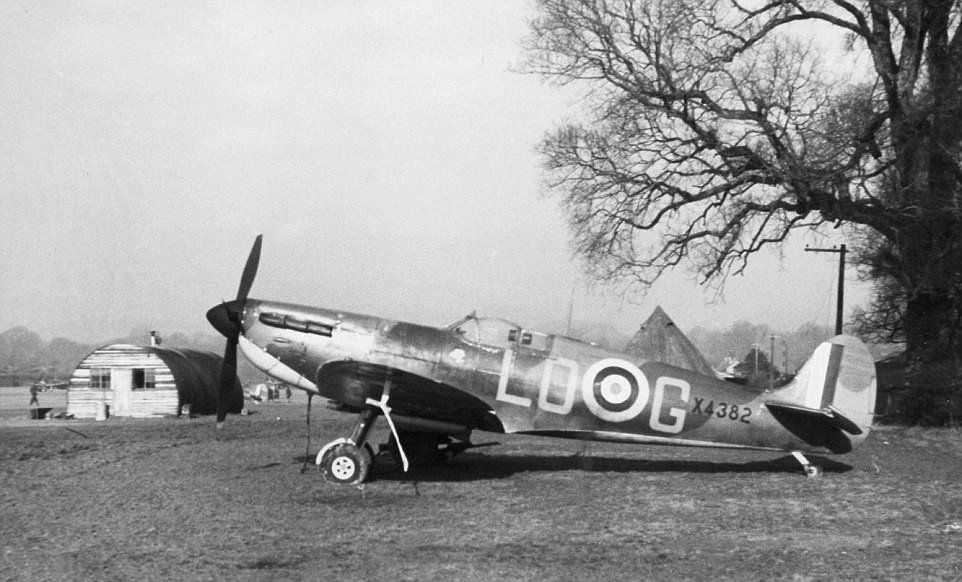
X4382, a late production Spitfire Mk I of 602 Squadron flown by P/O Osgood Hanbury, Westhampnett, September 1940

The performance of the Spitfire over Dunkirk came as a surprise to the Jagdwaffe, although the German pilots retained a strong belief that the 109 was the superior fighter. The British fighters were equipped with eight Browning .303 (7.7mm) machine guns firing bullets, while most Bf 109Es had two 20mm cannons firing explosive shells, supplemented by two 7.92mm machine guns. (Note: Bf 109E-3 and E-4s had this armament, while the E-1, which was still used in large numbers, was armed with four 7.92mm machine guns.) The 20mm cannons were much more effective than the .303; during the Battle it was not unknown for damaged German bombers to limp home with up to two hundred .303 hits. At some altitudes, the Bf 109 could outclimb the British fighter. It could also engage in vertical-plane negative-g manoeuvres without the engine cutting out because its DB 601 engine used fuel injection; this allowed the 109 to dive away from attackers more readily than the carburettor-equipped Merlin. On the other hand, the Bf 109E had the disadvantage of a much larger turning circle than its two foes. In general, though, as Alfred Price noted in The Spitfire Story:

... the differences between the Spitfire and the Me 109 in performance and handling were only marginal, and in a combat they were almost always surmounted by tactical considerations of which side had seen the other first, which had the advantage of sun, altitude, numbers, pilot ability, tactical situation, tactical co-ordination, amount of fuel remaining, etc.

The Bf 109E was also used as a Jabo (jagdbomber, fighter-bomber) – the E-4/B and E-7 models could carry a 250 kg bomb underneath the fuselage, the later model arriving during the battle. The Bf 109, unlike the Stuka, could fight on equal terms with RAF fighters after releasing its ordnance.

At the start of the battle, the twin-engined Messerschmitt Bf 110C long-range Zerstörer ("Destroyer") was also expected to engage in air-to-air combat while escorting the Luftwaffe bomber fleet. Although the 110 was faster than the Hurricane and almost as fast as the Spitfire, its lack of manoeuvrability and acceleration meant that it was a failure as a long-range escort fighter. On 13 and 15 August, thirteen and thirty aircraft were lost, the equivalent of an entire Gruppe, and the type's worst losses during the campaign. This trend continued with a further eight and fifteen lost on 16 and 17 August.

The most successful role of the Bf 110 during the battle was as a Schnellbomber (fast bomber). The Bf 110 usually used a shallow dive to bomb the target and escape at high speed. One unit, Erprobungsgruppe 210 – initially formed as the service test unit (Erprobungskommando) for the emerging successor to the 110, the Me 210 – proved that the Bf 110 could still be used to good effect in attacking small or "pinpoint" targets.

The RAF's Boulton Paul Defiant had some initial success over Dunkirk because of its resemblance to the Hurricane; Luftwaffe fighters attacking from the rear were surprised by its unusual gun turret, which could fire to the rear. During the Battle of Britain, it proved hopelessly outclassed. The Defiant, designed to attack bombers without fighter escort, lacked any form of forward-firing armament, and the heavy turret and second crewman meant it could not outrun or outmanoeuvre either the Bf 109 or Bf 110. By the end of August, after disastrous losses, the aircraft was withdrawn from daylight service.

=== Bombers ===
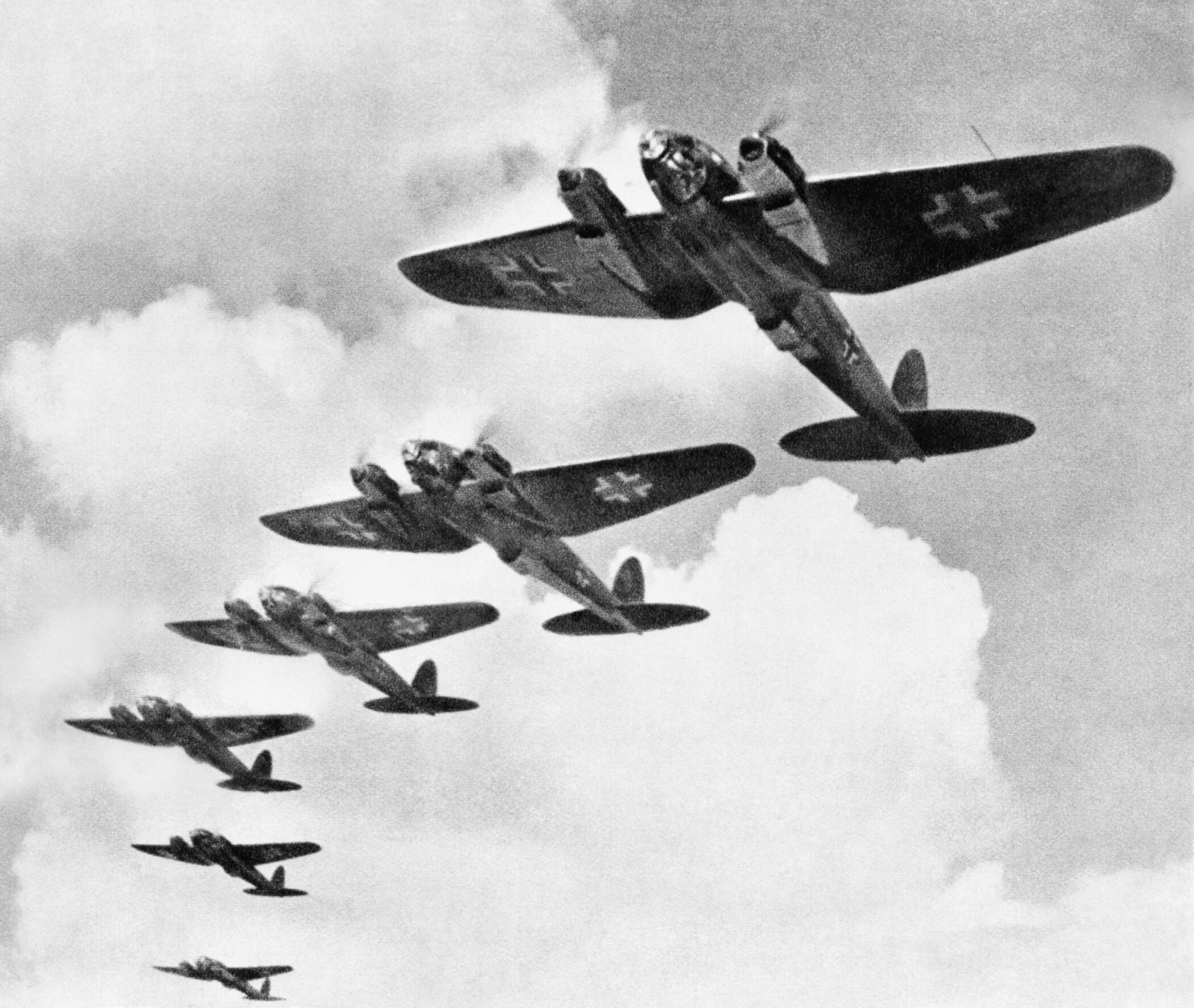
Heinkel He 111 bombers during the Battle of Britain

The Luftwaffe's primary bombers were the Heinkel He 111, Dornier Do 17, and Junkers Ju 88 for level bombing at medium to high altitudes, the Ju88 and the Junkers Ju 87 Stuka for dive-bombing. The He 111 was used in greater numbers than the others during the conflict, and was better known, partly due to its distinctive wing shape. Each level bomber also had a few reconnaissance versions accompanying them that were used during the battle.

Although it had been successful in previous Luftwaffe engagements, the Stuka suffered heavy losses in the Battle of Britain, particularly on 18 August, due to its slow speed and vulnerability to fighter interception after dive-bombing a target. As the losses went up Stuka units, with limited payload and range in addition to their vulnerability, were largely removed from operations over England and diverted to concentrate on shipping, until eventually re-deployed to the Eastern Front in 1941. For some raids they were called back, such as on 13 September to attack Tangmere airfield.

The remaining three bomber types differed in their capabilities; the Dornier Do 17 was both the slowest and had the smallest bomb load; the Ju 88 was the fastest once its mainly external bomb load was dropped; and the He 111 carried the largest, internal, bomb load. All three bomber types suffered heavy losses from the home-based British fighters, but the Ju 88 had significantly lower loss rates due to its greater speed and its ability to dive out of trouble (it was originally designed as a dive bomber). The German bombers required constant protection by the Luftwaffe's insufficiently numerous fighter force. Bf 109Es were ordered to support more than 300–400 bombers on any given day. Later in the conflict, when night bombing became more frequent, all three were used. Due to its smaller bomb load, the lighter Do 17 was used less than the He 111 and Ju 88 for this purpose.

On the British side, three bomber types were mostly used on night operations against targets such as factories, invasion ports and railway centres; the Armstrong Whitworth Whitley, the Handley-Page Hampden and the Vickers Wellington were classified as heavy bombers by the RAF, although the Hampden was a medium bomber comparable to the He 111. The twin-engined Bristol Blenheim and the obsolescent single-engined Fairey Battle were both light bombers; the Blenheim was the most numerous of the aircraft equipping RAF Bomber Command, and was used in attacks against shipping, ports, airfields and factories on the continent by day and by night. The Fairey Battle squadrons, which had suffered heavy losses in daylight attacks during the Battle of France, were brought up to strength with reserve aircraft and continued to operate at night in attacks against the invasion ports, until the Battle was withdrawn from UK front-line service in October 1940. (Note: "But night after night. the Battles and the Blenheims, the Wellingtons, the Whitleys and the Hampdens went forth.")

=== Pilots ===
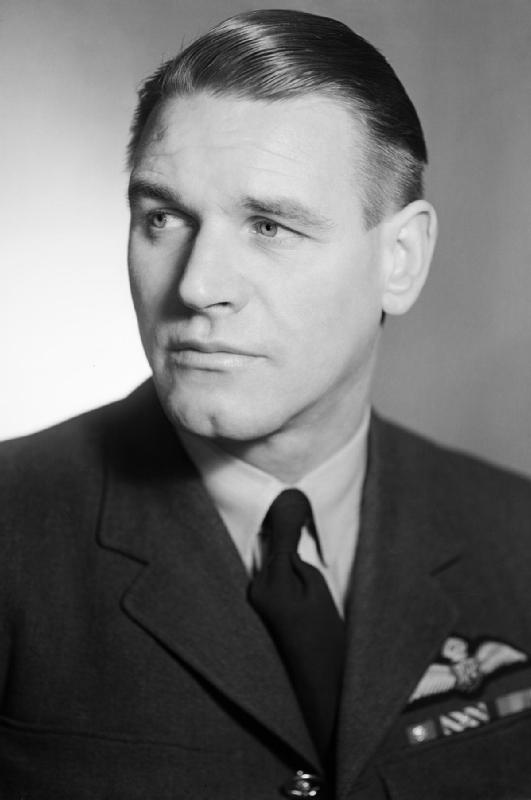
South African Adolph "Sailor" Malan led No. 74 Squadron RAF and was, at the time, the RAF's leading ace

Before the war, the RAF's processes for selecting potential candidates were opened to men of all social classes through the creation in 1936 of the RAF Volunteer Reserve, which "... was designed to appeal, to ... young men ... without any class distinctions ..." The older squadrons of the Royal Auxiliary Air Force did retain some of their upper-class exclusiveness, but their numbers were soon swamped by the newcomers of the RAFVR; by 1 September 1939, 6,646 pilots had been trained through the RAFVR.

By mid-1940, there were about 9,000 pilots in the RAF to man about 5,000 aircraft, most of which were bombers. Fighter Command was never short of pilots, but the problem of finding sufficient numbers of fully trained fighter pilots became acute by mid-August 1940. With aircraft production running at 300 planes each week, only 200 pilots were trained in the same period. In addition, more pilots were allocated to squadrons than there were aircraft, as this allowed squadrons to maintain operational strength despite casualties and still provide for pilot leave. Another factor was that only about 30% of the 9,000 pilots were assigned to operational squadrons; 20% of the pilots were involved in conducting pilot training, and a further 20% were undergoing further instruction, like that offered in Canada and in Southern Rhodesia to the Commonwealth trainees, although already qualified. The rest were assigned to staff positions, since RAF policy dictated that only pilots could make many staff and operational command decisions, even in engineering matters. At the height of the fighting, and despite Churchill's insistence, only 30 pilots were released to the front line from administrative duties. (Note: The pilots occupying these administrative positions included such officers as Dowding, Park and Leigh-Mallory and the numbers actually fit to serve in front line fighter squadrons are open to question.)

For these reasons, and the permanent loss of 435 pilots during the Battle of France alone along with many more wounded, and others lost in Norway, the RAF had fewer experienced pilots at the start of the Battle of Britain than the Luftwaffe. It was the lack of trained pilots in the fighting squadrons, rather than the lack of aircraft, that became the greatest concern for Air Chief Marshal Hugh Dowding, commander of Fighter Command. Drawing from regular RAF forces, the Auxiliary Air Force and the Volunteer Reserve, the British were able to muster some 1,103 fighter pilots on 1 July. Replacement pilots, with little flight training and often no gunnery training, suffered high casualty rates, exacerbating the problem.

The Luftwaffe, on the other hand, were able to muster a large number (1,450) of experienced fighter pilots. Drawing from a cadre of Spanish Civil War veterans, these pilots already had comprehensive courses in aerial gunnery and instructions in tactics suited for fighter-versus-fighter combat. Training manuals discouraged heroism, stressing the importance of attacking only when the odds were in the pilot's favour. Despite the high levels of experience, German fighter formations did not provide a sufficient reserve of pilots to allow for losses and leave, and the Luftwaffe was unable to produce enough pilots to prevent a decline in operational strength as the battle progressed.

== International participation ==
=== Allies ===
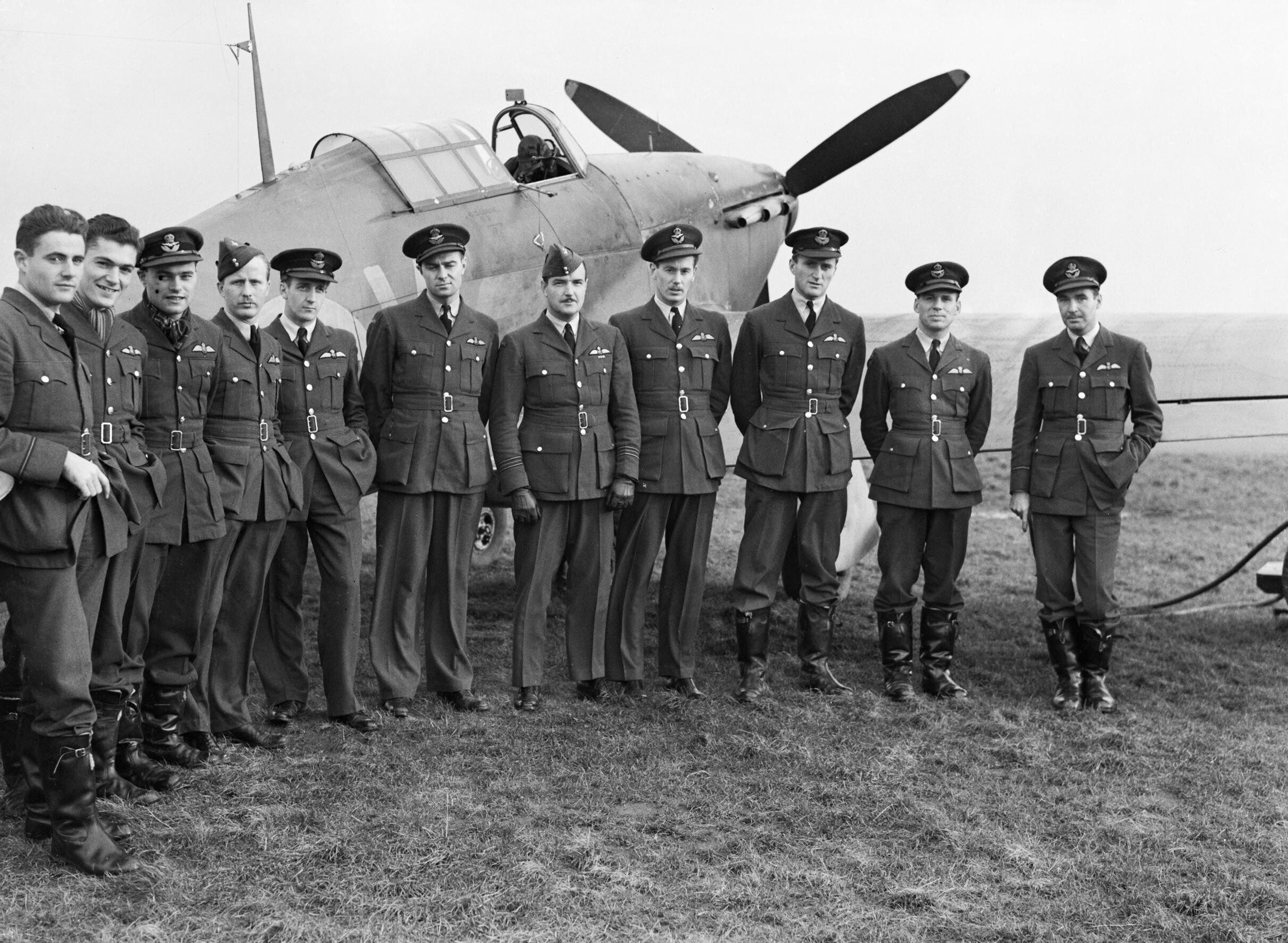
Canadian pilots from No. 1 Squadron RCAF with one of their Hawker Hurricanes at Prestwick, Scotland, 30 October 1940

About 20% of pilots who took part in the battle were from non-British countries. The Royal Air Force roll of honour for the Battle of Britain recognises 595 non-British pilots (out of 2,936) as flying at least one authorised operational sortie with an eligible unit of the RAF or Fleet Air Arm between 10 July and 31 October 1940. These included 145 Poles, 127 New Zealanders, 112 Canadians, 88 Czechoslovaks, 10 Irish, 32 Australians, 28 Belgians, 25 South Africans, 13 French, 9 Americans, 3 Southern Rhodesians and individuals from Jamaica, Barbados and Newfoundland. Altogether in the fighter battles, the bombing raids, and the various patrols flown between 10 July and 31 October 1940 by the Royal Air Force, 1495 aircrew were killed, of whom 449 were fighter pilots, 718 aircrew from Bomber Command, and 280 from Coastal Command. Among those killed were 47 airmen from Canada, 24 from Australia, 17 from South Africa, 30 from Poland (Note: Polish units in the composition of the RAF taking part in the Battle of Britain, first in composition, and then alongside the RAF fought four Polish squadrons: two bomber (300 and 301), 2 Hunting (302 and 303) and 81 Polish pilots in British squadrons, a total of 144 Polish pilots (killed 29 ), representing 5% of all the pilots of the RAF taking part in the battle. Poles shot down about 170 German aircraft, damaged 36, representing about 12% of the losses of the Luftwaffe. Squadron 303 was the best unit air, taking part in the Battle of Britain – reported shot down 126 Luftwaffe planes.), 20 from Czechoslovakia and six from Belgium. Forty-seven New Zealanders lost their lives, including 15 fighter pilots, 24 bomber and eight coastal aircrew. The names of these Allied and Commonwealth airmen are inscribed in a memorial book that rests in the Battle of Britain Chapel in Westminster Abbey. In the chapel is a stained glass window which contains the badges of the fighter squadrons which operated during the battle and the flags of the nations to which the pilots and aircrew belonged. These pilots, some of whom had to flee their home countries because of German invasions, fought with distinction.

The No. 303 Polish Fighter Squadron was the highest-scoring fighter squadron of the Battle of Britain, even though it joined the fray two months after the battle had begun. "Had it not been for the magnificent material contributed by the Polish squadrons and their unsurpassed gallantry," wrote Air Chief Marshal Hugh Dowding, head of RAF Fighter Command, "I hesitate to say that the outcome of the Battle would have been the same."

=== Axis ===
At the urging of Italian dictator Benito Mussolini, an element of the Italian Royal Air Force (Regia Aeronautica) called the Italian Air Corps (Corpo Aereo Italiano or CAI) took part in the later stages of the Battle of Britain. It first saw action on 24 October 1940 when a force of Fiat BR.20 medium bombers attacked the port at Harwich. The CAI achieved limited success during this and subsequent raids. The unit was redeployed in January 1941, having claimed to have shot down at least nine British aircraft. This was inaccurate and their actual successes were much lower.

== Luftwaffe strategy ==
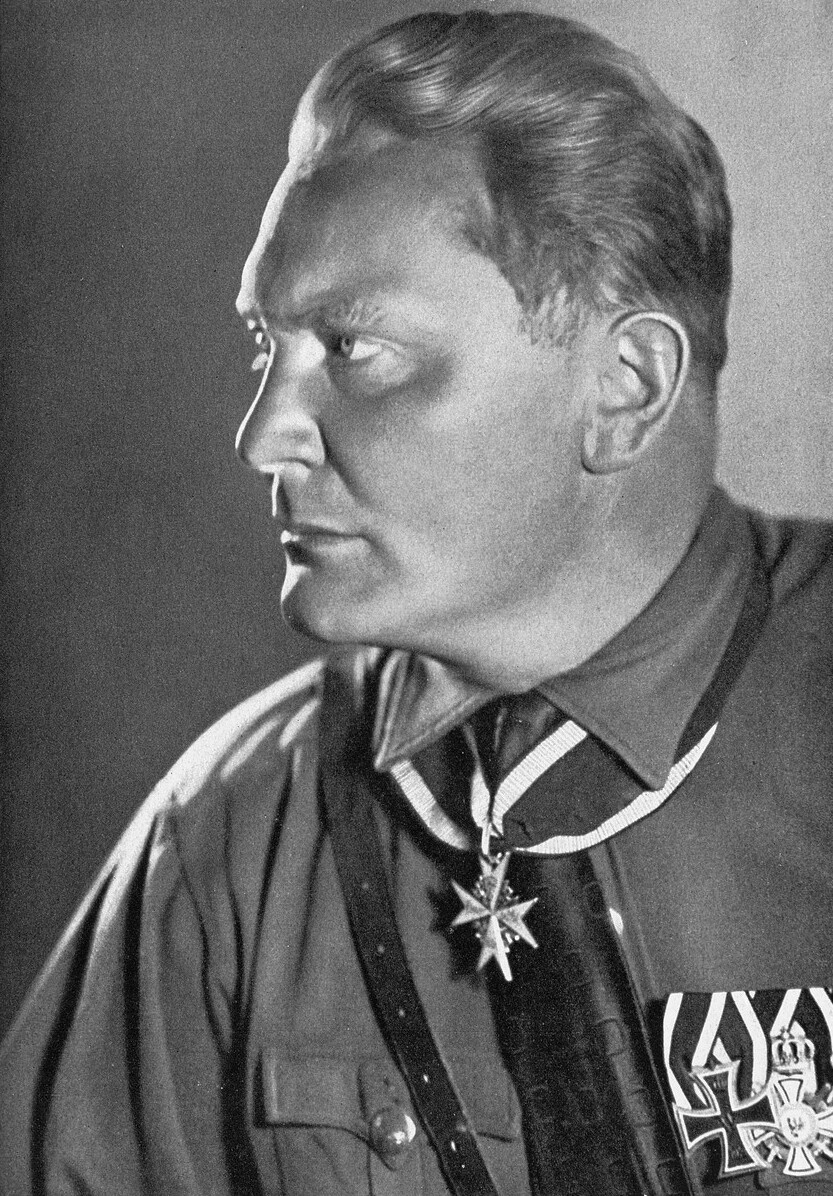
Hermann Göring, the commander of the Luftwaffe

The indecision of OKL over what to do was reflected in shifts in Luftwaffe strategy. The doctrine of concentrated close air support of the army at the battlefront succeeded against Poland, Denmark and Norway, the Low Countries and France but incurred significant losses. The Luftwaffe had to build or repair bases in the conquered territories, and rebuild its strength. In June 1940 it began regular armed reconnaissance flights and sporadic Störangriffe, nuisance raids of one or a few bombers by day and night. These gave crews practice in navigation and avoiding air defences and set off air raid alarms which disturbed civilian morale. Similar nuisance raids continued throughout the battle, into late 1940. Scattered naval mine-laying sorties began at the outset and increased gradually over the battle period.

Göring's operational directive of 30 June ordered the destruction of the RAF, including the aircraft industry, to end RAF bombing raids on Germany and facilitating attacks on ports and storage in the Luftwaffe blockade of Britain. Attacks on Channel shipping in the Kanalkampf began on 4 July, and were formalised on 11 July in an order by Hans Jeschonnek which added the arms industry as a target. On 16 July, Directive No. 16 ordered preparations for Operation Sea Lion and on the next day the Luftwaffe was ordered to stand by in full readiness. Göring met his air fleet commanders and on 24 July issued orders for gaining air supremacy, protecting the army and navy if the invasion went ahead and attacking Royal Navy ships and continuing the blockade. Once the RAF had been defeated, Luftwaffe bombers were to move forward beyond London without the need for fighter escort, destroying military and economic targets.

At a meeting on 1 August the command reviewed plans produced by each Fliegerkorps with differing proposals for targets including whether to bomb airfields but failed to decide a priority. Intelligence reports gave Göring the impression that the RAF was almost defeated, so that raids would attract British fighters for the Luftwaffe to shoot down. On 6 August he finalised plans for Adlertag (Eagle Day) with Kesselring, Sperrle and Stumpff; the destruction of RAF Fighter Command in the south of England was to take four days, with lightly escorted small bomber raids leaving the main fighter force free to attack RAF fighters. Bombing of military and economic targets was then to systematically extend up to the Midlands until daylight attacks could proceed unhindered over the whole of Britain.

Bombing of London was to be held back while these night time "destroyer" attacks proceeded over other urban areas, then, in the culmination of the campaign, a major attack on the capital was intended to cause a crisis, with refugees fleeing London just as Operation Sea Lion was to begin. With hopes fading for the possibility of invasion, on 4 September Hitler authorised a main focus on day and night attacks on tactical targets, with London as the main target, which became known as the Blitz. With increasing difficulty in defending bombers in day raids, the Luftwaffe shifted to a strategic bombing campaign of night raids aiming to overcome British resistance by damaging infrastructure and food stocks, though intentional terror bombing of civilians was not sanctioned.

=== Regrouping of Luftwaffe into Luftflotten ===
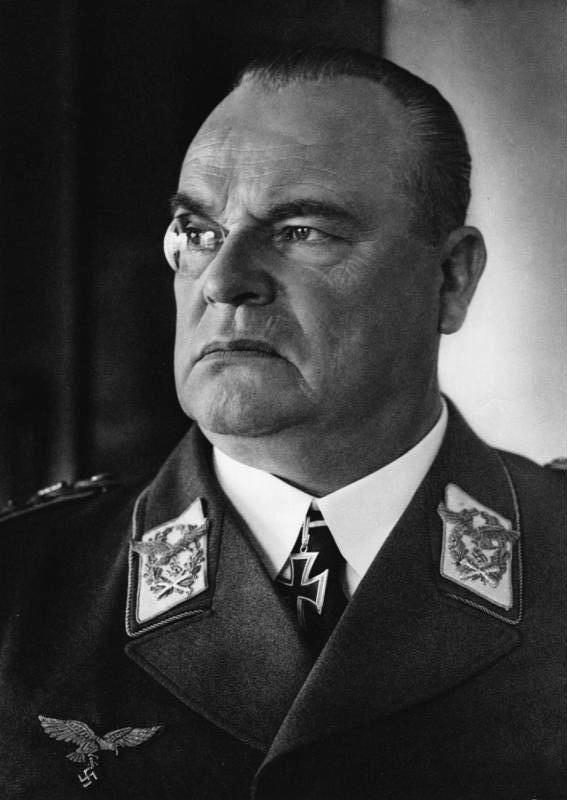
Hugo Sperrle, the commander of Luftflotte 3

The Luftwaffe regrouped after the Battle of France into three Luftflotten (Air Fleets) opposite Britain's southern and eastern coasts. Luftflotte 2 (Generalfeldmarschall Albert Kesselring), was responsible for the bombing of south-east England and the London area. Luftflotte 3 (Generalfeldmarschall Hugo Sperrle) concentrated on the West Country, Wales, the Midlands and north-west England. Luftflotte 5 (Generaloberst Hans-Jürgen Stumpff) from his headquarters in Norway, attacked the north of England and Scotland. As the battle progressed, command responsibility shifted, with Luftflotte 3 taking more responsibility for the night bombing and the main daylight operations fell upon Luftflotte 2.

Initial Luftwaffe estimates were that it would take four days to defeat RAF Fighter Command in southern England. This would be followed by a four-week offensive during which the bombers and long-range fighters would destroy all military installations throughout the country and wreck the British aircraft industry. The campaign was planned to begin with attacks on airfields near the coast, gradually moving inland to attack the ring of sector airfields defending London. Later reassessments gave the Luftwaffe five weeks, from 8 August to 15 September, to establish temporary air superiority over England. Fighter Command had to be destroyed, either on the ground or in the air, yet the Luftwaffe had to preserve its strength to be able to support the invasion; the Luftwaffe had to maintain a high "kill ratio" over the RAF fighters. The only alternative to the goal of air superiority was a terror bombing campaign aimed at the civilian population but this was considered a last resort and it was forbidden by Hitler. The Luftwaffe kept broadly to this scheme but its commanders had differences of opinion on strategy. Sperrle wanted to eradicate the air defence infrastructure by bombing it. Kesselring championed attacking London directly, either to bombard the British government into submission or to draw RAF fighters into a decisive battle. Göring did nothing to resolve this disagreement between his commanders and gave only vague directives during the initial stages of the battle, apparently unable to decide upon which strategy to pursue.

=== Tactics ===
==== Fighter formations ====
Luftwaffe formations employed a loose section of two Rotte (packs), based on a leader (Rottenführer) followed at a distance of about 200 m (220 yd) by his wingman, Rottenhund (pack dog) or Katschmarek - the turning radius of a Bf 109, enabling both aircraft to turn together at high speed. The Katschmarek flew slightly higher and was trained always to stay with his leader. With more room between them, both could spend less time maintaining formation and more time looking around and covering each other's blind spots. Attacking aircraft could be sandwiched between the two 109s. The formation was developed from principles formulated by the First World War ace Oswald Boelcke in 1916. In 1934 the Finnish Air Force adopted similar formations, called partio (patrol; two aircraft) and parvi (two patrols; four aircraft), for similar reasons, though Luftwaffe pilots during the Spanish Civil War (led by Günther Lützow and Werner Mölders, among others) are generally given credit. The Rotte allowed the Rottenführer to concentrate on shooting down aircraft but few wingmen had the chance, leading to some resentment in the lower ranks where it was felt that the high scores came at their expense. Two Rotten combined as a Schwarm, where all the pilots could watch what was happening around them. Each Schwarm in a Staffel (squadron) flew at staggered heights and with about 200 m (220 yd) between them, making the formation difficult to spot at longer ranges and allowing for a great deal of flexibility. By using a tight "cross-over" turn, a Schwarm could quickly change direction.

The Bf 110s adopted the same Schwarm formation as the 109s but were seldom able to use this to the same advantage. The Bf 110's most successful method of attack was the "bounce" from above. When attacked, Zerstörergruppen increasingly resorted to forming large defensive circles, where each Bf 110 guarded the tail of the aircraft ahead of it. Göring ordered that they be renamed "offensive circles" in a vain bid to improve rapidly declining morale. These conspicuous formations were often successful in attracting RAF fighters that were sometimes "bounced" by high-flying Bf 109s. This led to the often repeated misconception that the Bf 110s were escorted by Bf 109s.

==== Higher-level dispositions ====
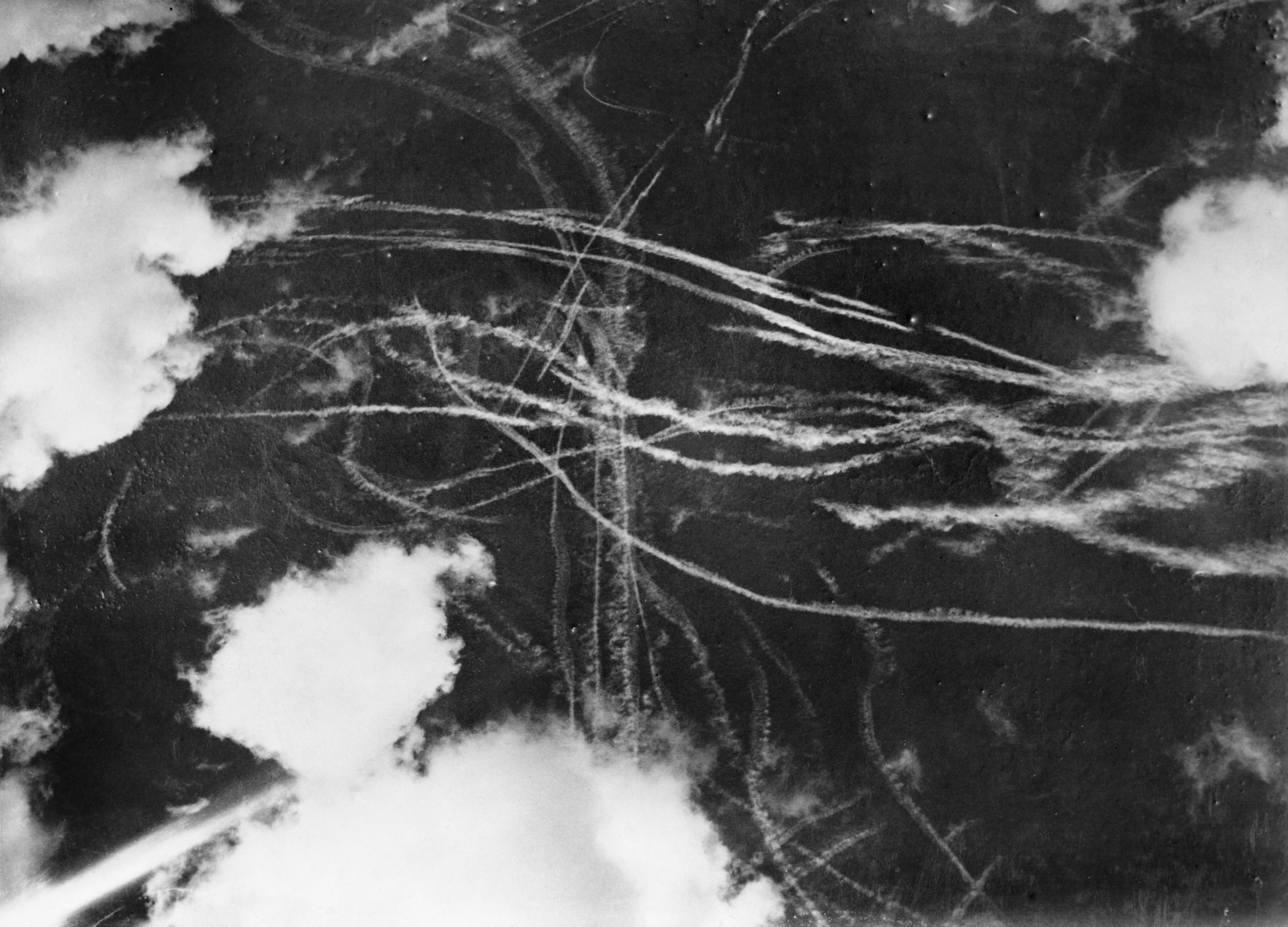
Pattern of vapour trails left by British and German aircraft after a dogfight

Luftwaffe tactics were influenced by their fighters. The Bf 110 proved too vulnerable against the nimble single-engined RAF fighters and the bulk of fighter escort duties devolved to the Bf 109. Fighter tactics were then complicated by bomber crews who demanded closer protection. After the hard-fought battles of 15 and 18 August, Göring met his unit leaders. The need for the fighters to meet up on time with the bombers was stressed. It was also decided that one bomber Gruppe could only be properly protected by several Gruppen of 109s. Göring stipulated that as many fighters as possible were to be left free for Freie Jagd ("Free Hunts": a free-roving fighter sweep preceded a raid to try to sweep defenders out of the raid's path). The Ju 87 units, which had suffered heavy casualties, were only to be used under favourable circumstances. In early September, due to increasing complaints from the bomber crews about RAF fighters seemingly able to get through the escort screen, Göring ordered an increase in close escort duties. This decision shackled many of the Bf 109s to the bombers and, although they were more successful at protecting the bombers, casualties amongst the fighters mounted, primarily because they were forced to fly and manoeuvre at reduced speeds.

The Luftwaffe varied its tactics to break Fighter Command. It launched many Freie Jagd to draw up RAF fighters. RAF fighter controllers were often able to detect these and position squadrons to avoid them, keeping to Dowding's plan to preserve fighter strength for the bomber formations. The Luftwaffe also tried using small formations of bombers as bait, covering them with large numbers of escorts. This was more successful, but escort duty kept the fighters tied to the slower bombers making them more vulnerable.

By September, standard tactics for raids had become an amalgam of techniques. A Freie Jagd would precede the main attack formations. The bombers would fly in at altitudes between 5,000 and 6,000 m (16,000 and 20,000 ft), closely escorted by fighters. Escorts were divided into two parts (usually Gruppen), some operating close to the bombers and others a few hundred yards away and a little above. If the formation was attacked from the starboard, the starboard section engaged the attackers, the top section moving to starboard and the port section to the top position. If the attack came from the port side the system was reversed. British fighters coming from the rear were engaged by the rear section and the two outside sections similarly moving to the rear. If the threat came from above, the top section went into action while the side sections gained height to be able to follow RAF fighters down as they broke away. If attacked, all sections flew in defensive circles. These tactics were skilfully evolved and carried out and were difficult to counter.

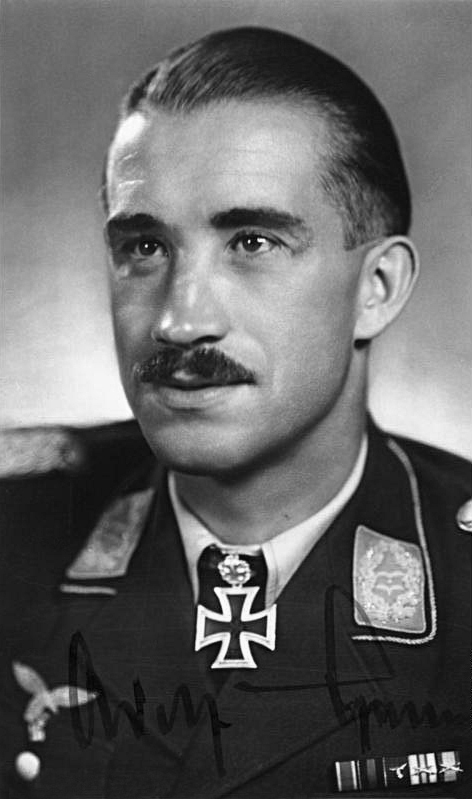
Adolf Galland, the successful leader of III./JG 26, became Geschwaderkommodore of JG 26 on 22 August.

Adolf Galland noted:

We had the impression that, whatever we did, we were bound to be wrong. Fighter protection for bombers created many problems which had to be solved in action. Bomber pilots preferred close screening in which their formation was surrounded by pairs of fighters pursuing a zigzag course. Obviously, the visible presence of the protective fighters gave the bomber pilots a greater sense of security. However, this was a faulty conclusion, because a fighter can only carry out this purely defensive task by taking the initiative in the offensive. He must never wait until attacked because he then loses the chance of acting. We fighter pilots certainly preferred the free chase during the approach and over the target area. This gives the greatest relief and the best protection for the bomber force.

The biggest disadvantage faced by Bf 109 pilots was that without the benefit of long-range drop tanks (which were introduced in limited numbers in the late stages of the battle), usually of 300 L (66 imp gal; 79 US gal) capacity, the 109s had an endurance of just over an hour and, for the 109E, a 600 km (370 mi) range. Once over Britain, a 109 pilot had to keep an eye on a red "low fuel" light on the instrument panel: once this was illuminated, he was forced to turn back and head for France. With the prospect of two long flights over water and knowing their range was substantially reduced when escorting bombers or during combat, the Jagdflieger coined the term Kanalkrankheit or "Channel sickness".

=== Intelligence ===
The Luftwaffe was ill-served by its lack of military intelligence about the British defences. The German intelligence services were fractured and plagued by rivalry; their performance was "amateurish". By 1940, there were few German agents operating in Great Britain and a handful of attempts to insert spies into the country were foiled.

As a result of intercepted radio transmissions, the Germans began to realise that the RAF fighters were being controlled from ground facilities; in July and August 1939, for example, the airship Graf Zeppelin, which was packed with equipment for listening in on RAF radio and RDF transmissions, flew around the coasts of Britain. Although the Luftwaffe correctly interpreted these new ground control procedures, they were incorrectly assessed as being rigid and ineffectual. A British radar system was well known to the Luftwaffe from intelligence gathered before the war, but the highly developed "Dowding system" linked with fighter control had been a well-kept secret. Even when good information existed, such as a November 1939 Abwehr assessment of Fighter Command strengths and capabilities by Abteilung V, it was ignored if it did not match conventional preconceptions.

On 16 July 1940, Abteilung V, commanded by Oberstleutnant "Beppo" Schmid, produced a report on the RAF and on Britain's defensive capabilities which was adopted by the frontline commanders as a basis for their operational plans. One of the most conspicuous failures of the report was the lack of information on the RAF's RDF network and control systems capabilities; it was assumed that the system was rigid and inflexible, with the RAF fighters being "tied" to their home bases. An optimistic (and, as it turned out, erroneous) conclusion reached was:

D. Supply Situation... At present the British aircraft industry produces about 180 to 300 first line fighters and 140 first line bombers a month. In view of the present conditions relating to production (the appearance of raw material difficulties, the disruption or breakdown of production at factories owing to air attacks, the increased vulnerability to air attack owing to the fundamental reorganisation of the aircraft industry now in progress), it is believed that for the time being output will decrease rather than increase. In the event of an intensification of air warfare it is expected that the present strength of the RAF will fall, and this decline will be aggravated by the continued decrease in production.

Because of this statement, reinforced by another more detailed report, issued on 10 August, there was a mindset in the ranks of the Luftwaffe that the RAF would run out of frontline fighters. The Luftwaffe believed it was weakening Fighter Command at three times the actual attrition rate. Many times, the leadership believed Fighter Command's strength had collapsed, only to discover that the RAF were able to send up defensive formations at will.

Throughout the battle, the Luftwaffe had to use numerous reconnaissance sorties to make up for poor intelligence. Reconnaissance aircraft (initially mostly Dornier Do 17s, but increasingly Bf 110s) proved easy prey for British fighters, as it was seldom possible for them to be escorted by Bf 109s. Thus, the Luftwaffe operated "blind" for much of the battle, unsure of its enemy's true strengths, capabilities, and deployments. Many of the Fighter Command airfields were never attacked, while raids against supposed fighter airfields fell instead on bomber or coastal defence stations. The results of bombing and air fighting were consistently exaggerated, due to inaccurate claims, over-enthusiastic reports and the difficulty of confirmation over enemy territory. In the euphoric atmosphere of perceived victory, the Luftwaffe leadership became increasingly disconnected from reality. This lack of leadership and solid intelligence meant the Germans did not adopt a consistent strategy. Moreover, there was never a systematic focus on one type of target (such as airbases, radar stations, or aircraft factories); consequently, the effectiveness of attacks, and their contribution to wider operational or strategic goals was further diluted.

=== Navigational aids ===
While the British were using radar for air defence more effectively than the Germans realised, the Luftwaffe attempted to press its own offensive with advanced radio navigation systems of which the British were initially not aware. One of these was Knickebein ("bent leg"); this system was used at night and for raids where precision was required. It was rarely used during the Battle of Britain.

=== Air-sea rescue ===
The Luftwaffe was much better prepared for the task of air-sea rescue than the RAF, specifically tasking the Seenotdienst unit, equipped with about 30 Heinkel He 59 floatplanes, with picking up downed aircrew from the North Sea, English Channel and the Dover Straits. In addition, Luftwaffe aircraft were equipped with life rafts and the aircrew were provided with sachets of a chemical called fluorescein which, on reacting with water, created a large, easy-to-see, bright green patch. In accordance with the Geneva Convention, the He 59s were unarmed and painted white with civilian registration markings and red crosses. Nevertheless, RAF aircraft attacked these aircraft, as some were escorted by Bf 109s.

After single He 59s were forced to land on the sea by RAF fighters on 1 and 9 July, a controversial order was issued to the RAF on 13 July; this stated that from 20 July, Seenotdienst aircraft were to be shot down. One of the reasons given by Churchill was:

We did not recognise this means of rescuing enemy pilots so they could come and bomb our civil population again ... all German air ambulances were forced down or shot down by our fighters on definite orders approved by the War Cabinet.

The British also believed that their crews would report on convoys, the Air Ministry issuing a communiqué to the German government on 14 July that Britain was

unable, however, to grant immunity to such aircraft flying over areas in which operations are in progress on land or at sea, or approaching British or Allied territory, or territory in British occupation, or British or Allied ships. Ambulance aircraft which do not comply with the above will do so at their own risk and peril.

The white He 59s were soon repainted in camouflage colours and armed with defensive machine guns. Although another four He 59s were shot down by RAF aircraft, the Seenotdienst continued to pick up downed Luftwaffe and Allied aircrew throughout the battle, earning praise from Adolf Galland for their bravery.

== RAF strategy ==
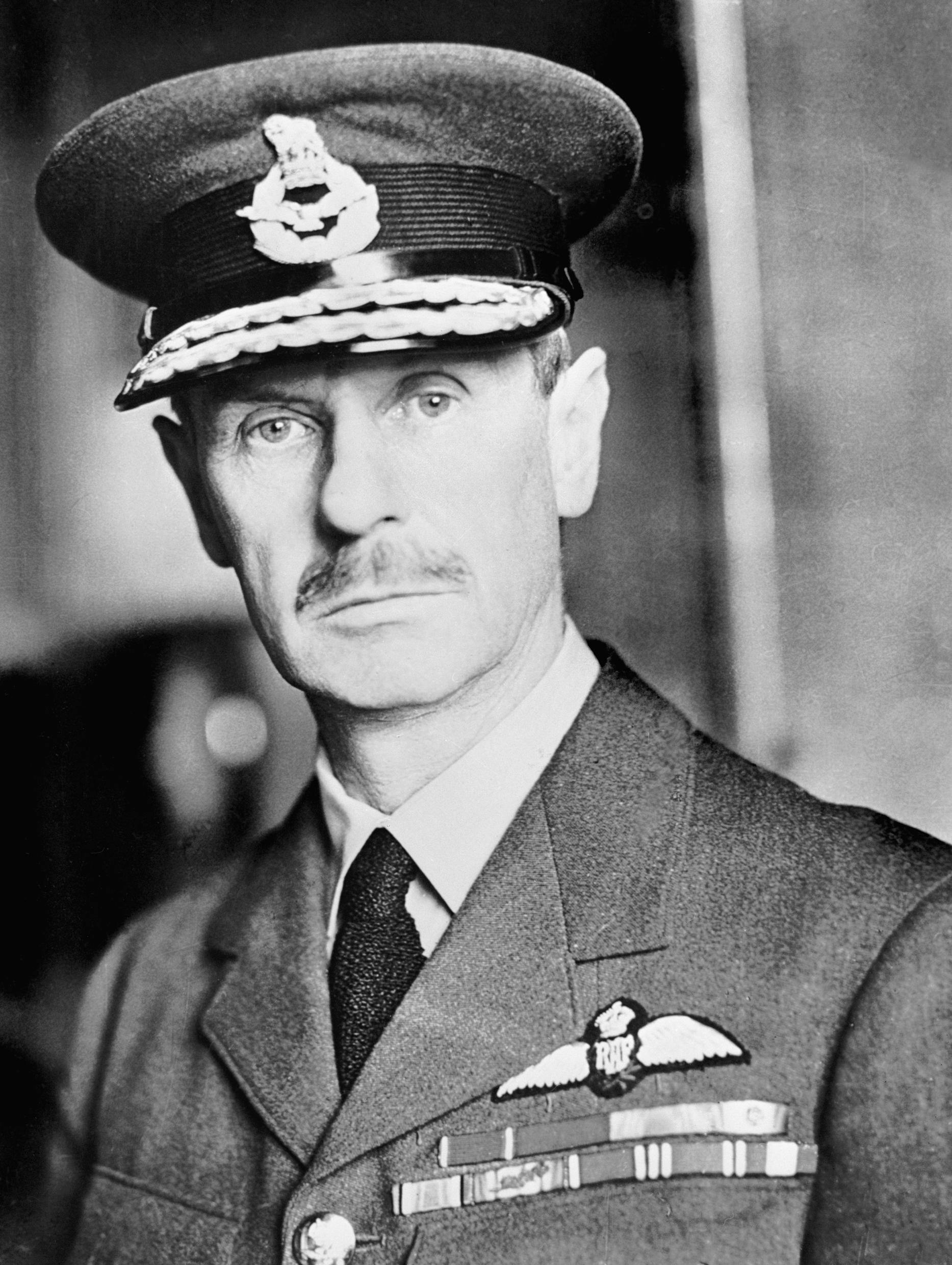
Commander-in-Chief, Air Chief Marshal Sir Hugh Dowding

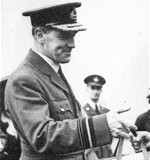
10 Group Commander, Sir Quintin Brand

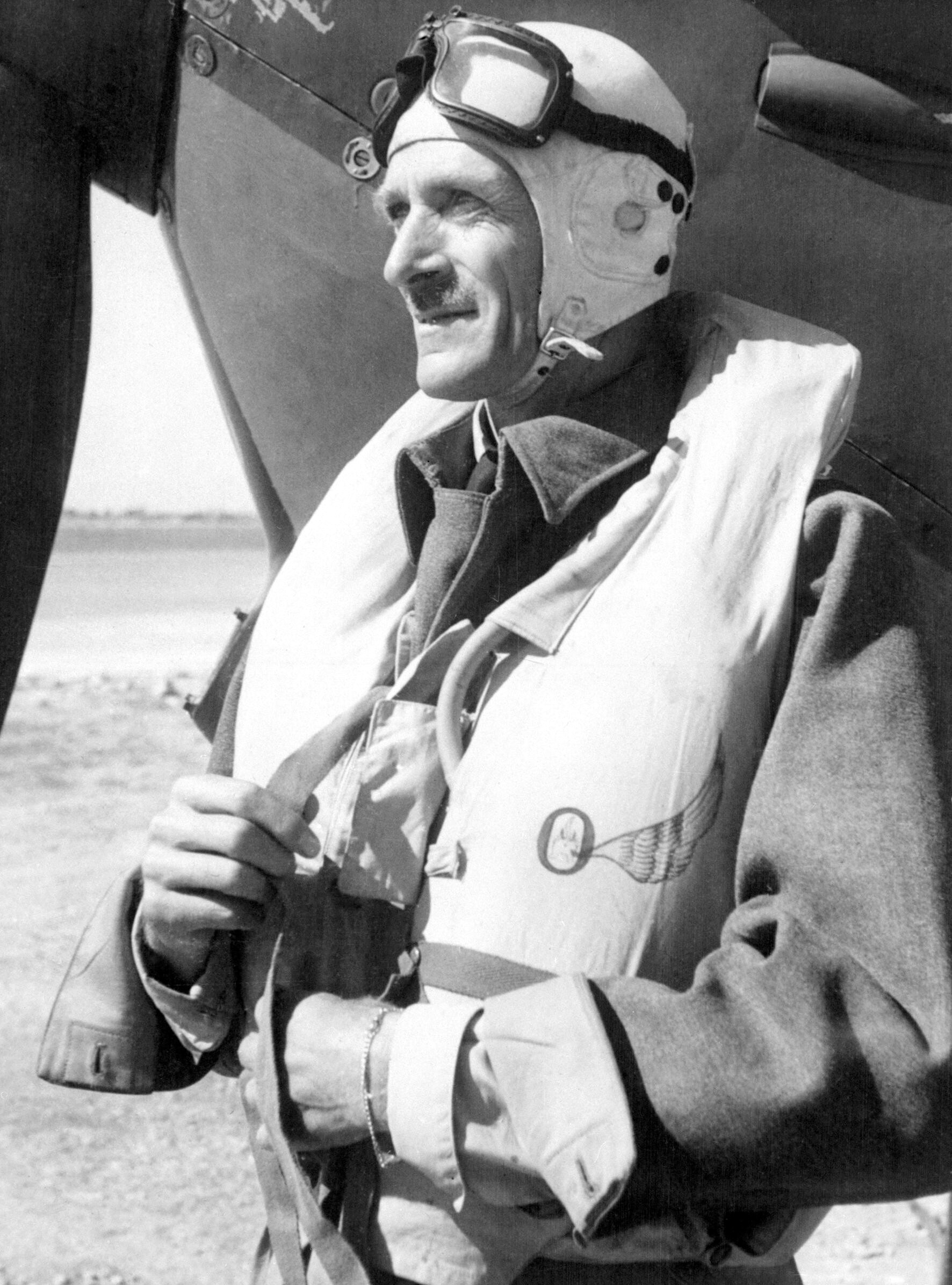
11 Group Commander, Keith Park

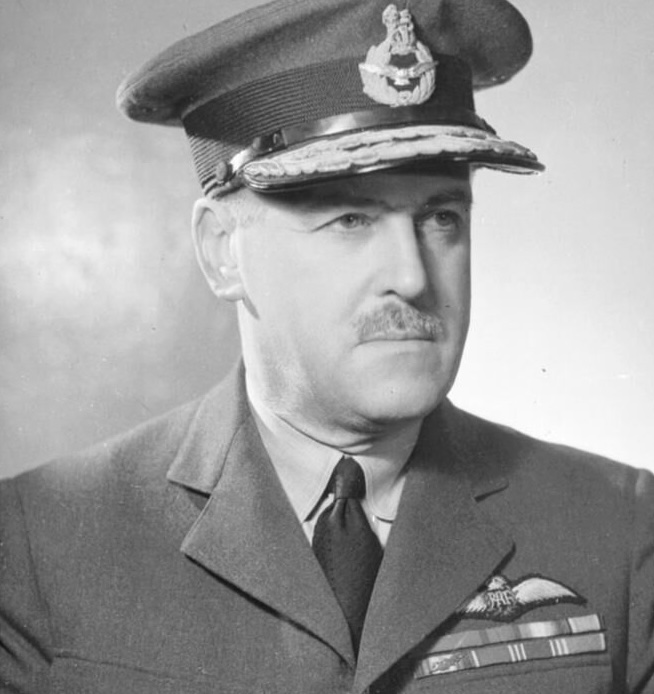
12 Group Commander, Trafford Leigh-Mallory

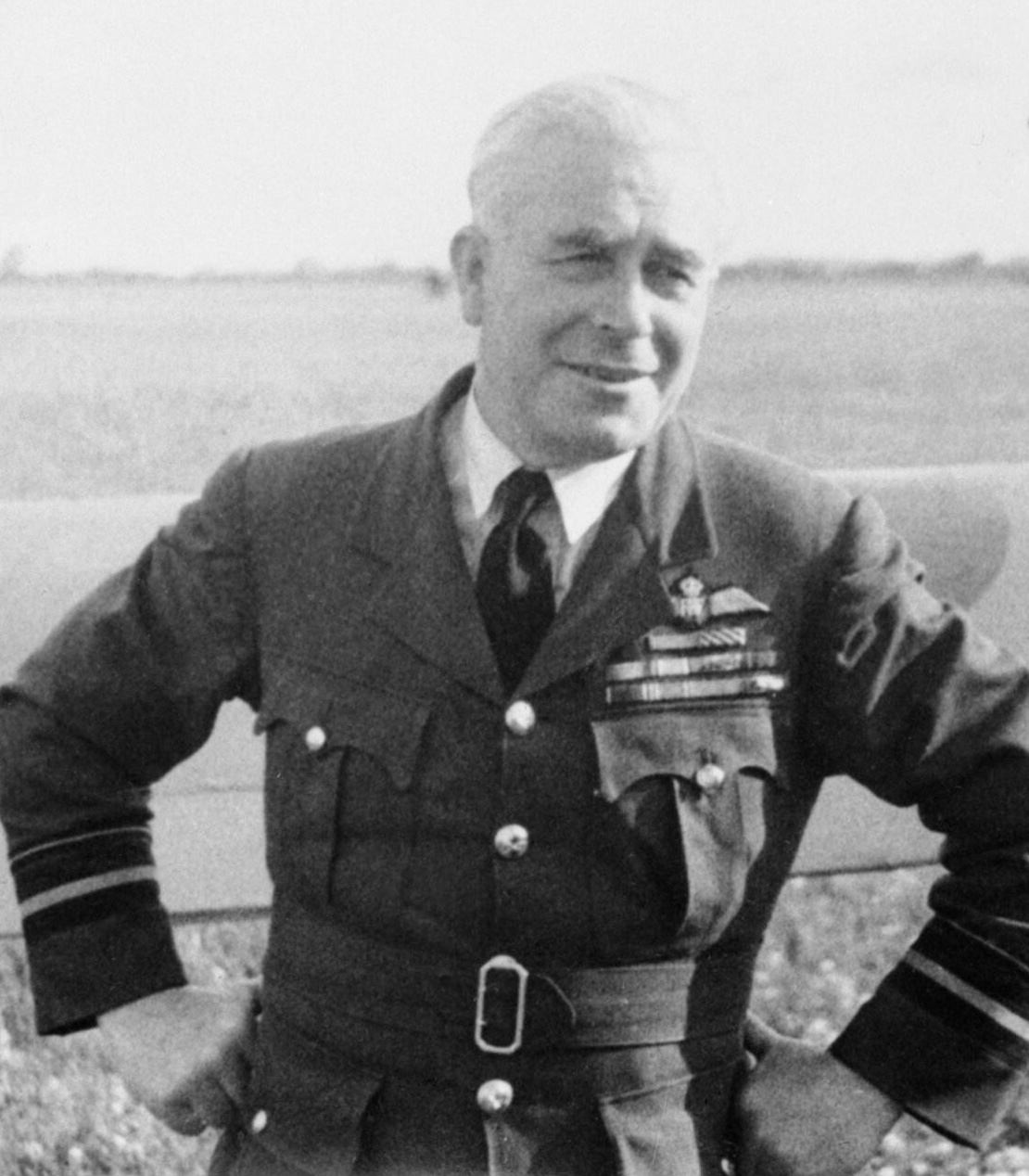
13 Group Commander, Richard Saul

=== The Dowding system ===
RAF and Luftwaffe bases, group and Luftflotte boundaries, and range of Luftwaffe Bf 109 fighters. Southern part of British radar coverage: radar in North of Scotland not shown.

During early tests of the Chain Home system, the slow flow of information from the CH radars and observers to the aircraft often caused them to miss their "bandits". The solution, today known as the "Dowding system", was to create a set of reporting chains to move information from the various observation points to the pilots in their fighters. It was named after its chief architect, "Stuffy" Dowding.

Reports from CH radars and the Observer Corps were sent directly to Fighter Command Headquarters (FCHQ) at Bentley Priory where they were "filtered" to combine multiple reports of the same formations into single tracks. Telephone operators would then forward only the information of interest to the Group headquarters, where the map would be re-created. This process was repeated to produce another version of the map at the Sector level, covering a much smaller area. Looking over their maps, Group level commanders could select squadrons to attack particular targets. From that point, the Sector operators would give commands to the fighters to arrange an interception, as well as return them to base. Sector stations also controlled the anti-aircraft batteries in their area; an army officer sat beside each fighter controller and directed the gun crews when to open and cease fire.

The Dowding system dramatically improved the speed and accuracy of the information that flowed to the pilots. During the early war period, it was expected that an average interception mission might have a 30% chance of ever seeing their target. During the battle, the Dowding system maintained an average rate over 75%, with several examples of 100% rates – every fighter dispatched found and intercepted its target. In contrast, Luftwaffe fighters attempting to intercept raids had to randomly seek their targets and often returned home having never seen enemy aircraft. The result is what is now known as an example of "force multiplication"; RAF fighters were as effective as two or more Luftwaffe fighters, greatly offsetting, or overturning, the disparity in actual numbers.

=== Intelligence ===
While Luftwaffe intelligence reports underestimated British fighter forces and aircraft production, the British intelligence estimates went the other way: they overestimated German aircraft production, numbers and range of aircraft available, and numbers of Luftwaffe pilots. In action, the Luftwaffe believed from their pilot claims and the impression given by aerial reconnaissance that the RAF was close to defeat, and the British made strenuous efforts to overcome the perceived advantages held by their opponents.

It is unclear how much the British intercepts of the Enigma cipher, used for high-security German radio communications, affected the battle. Ultra, the information obtained from Enigma intercepts, gave the highest echelons of the British command a view of German intentions. According to F. W. Winterbotham, who was the senior Air Staff representative in the Secret Intelligence Service, Ultra helped establish the strength and composition of the Luftwaffe's formations, the aims of the commanders and provided early warning of some raids. In early August it was decided that a small unit would be set up at FCHQ, which would process the flow of information from Bletchley and provide Dowding only with the most essential Ultra material; thus the Air Ministry did not have to send a continual flow of information to FCHQ, preserving secrecy, and Dowding was not inundated with non-essential information. Keith Park and his controllers were also told about Ultra. In a further attempt to camouflage the existence of Ultra, Dowding created a unit named No. 421 (Reconnaissance) Flight RAF. This unit (which later became No. 91 Squadron RAF), was equipped with Hurricanes and Spitfires and sent out aircraft to search for and report Luftwaffe formations approaching England. In addition, the radio listening service (known as Y Service), monitoring the patterns of Luftwaffe radio traffic contributed considerably to the early warning of raids.

=== Tactics ===
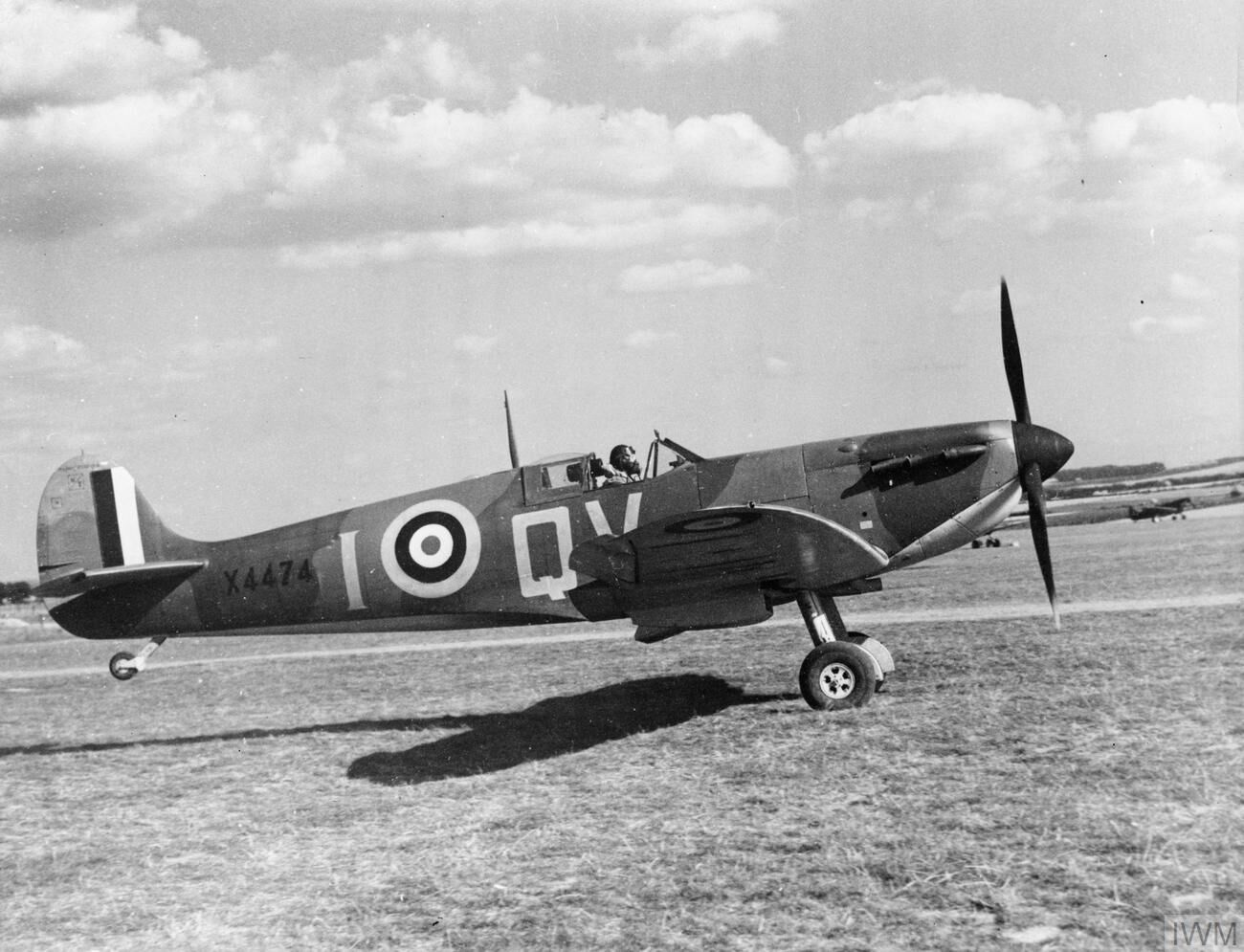
X4474, a late production Mk I Spitfire of 19 Squadron, September 1940. During the battle 19 Squadron was part of the Duxford Wing.

==== Fighter formations ====
In the late 1930s, Fighter Command expected to face only bombers over Britain, not single-engined fighters. A series of "Fighting Area Tactics" were formulated and rigidly adhered to, involving a series of manoeuvres designed to concentrate a squadron's firepower to bring down bombers. RAF fighters flew in tight, v-shaped sections ("vics") of three aircraft, with four such "sections" in tight formation. Only the squadron leader at the front was free to watch for the enemy; the other pilots had to concentrate on keeping station. Training also emphasised by-the-book attacks by sections breaking away in sequence. Fighter Command recognised the weaknesses of this structure early in the battle, but it was felt too risky to change tactics during the battle because replacement pilots – often with only minimal flying time – could not be readily retrained, and inexperienced pilots needed firm leadership in the air only rigid formations could provide. German pilots dubbed the RAF formations Idiotenreihen ("rows of idiots") because they left squadrons vulnerable to attack.

Front line RAF pilots were acutely aware of the inherent deficiencies of their own tactics. A compromise was adopted whereby squadron formations used much looser formations with one or two "weavers" flying independently above and behind to provide increased observation and rear protection; these tended to be the least experienced men and were often the first to be shot down without the other pilots even noticing that they were under attack. During the battle, 74 Squadron under Squadron Leader Adolph "Sailor" Malan adopted a variation of the German formation called the "fours in line astern", which was a vast improvement on the old three aircraft "vic". Malan's formation was later generally used by Fighter Command.

==== Squadron- and higher-level deployment ====
The weight of the battle fell upon 11 Group. Keith Park's tactics were to dispatch individual squadrons to intercept raids. The intention was to subject incoming bombers to continual attacks by relatively small numbers of fighters and try to break up the tight German formations. Once formations had fallen apart, stragglers could be picked off one by one. Where multiple squadrons intercepted a raid the intended procedure was for the slower Hurricanes to tackle the bombers while the more agile Spitfires engaged the fighter escort. This ideal was not always achieved, resulting in occasions when Spitfires and Hurricanes reversed roles. Park also issued instructions to his units to attack the bombers from the front, as they were more vulnerable to head-on approaches than to attacks from other angles. Again, in fast-moving, three-dimensional air battles, few RAF fighter units were able to attack the bombers head-on.

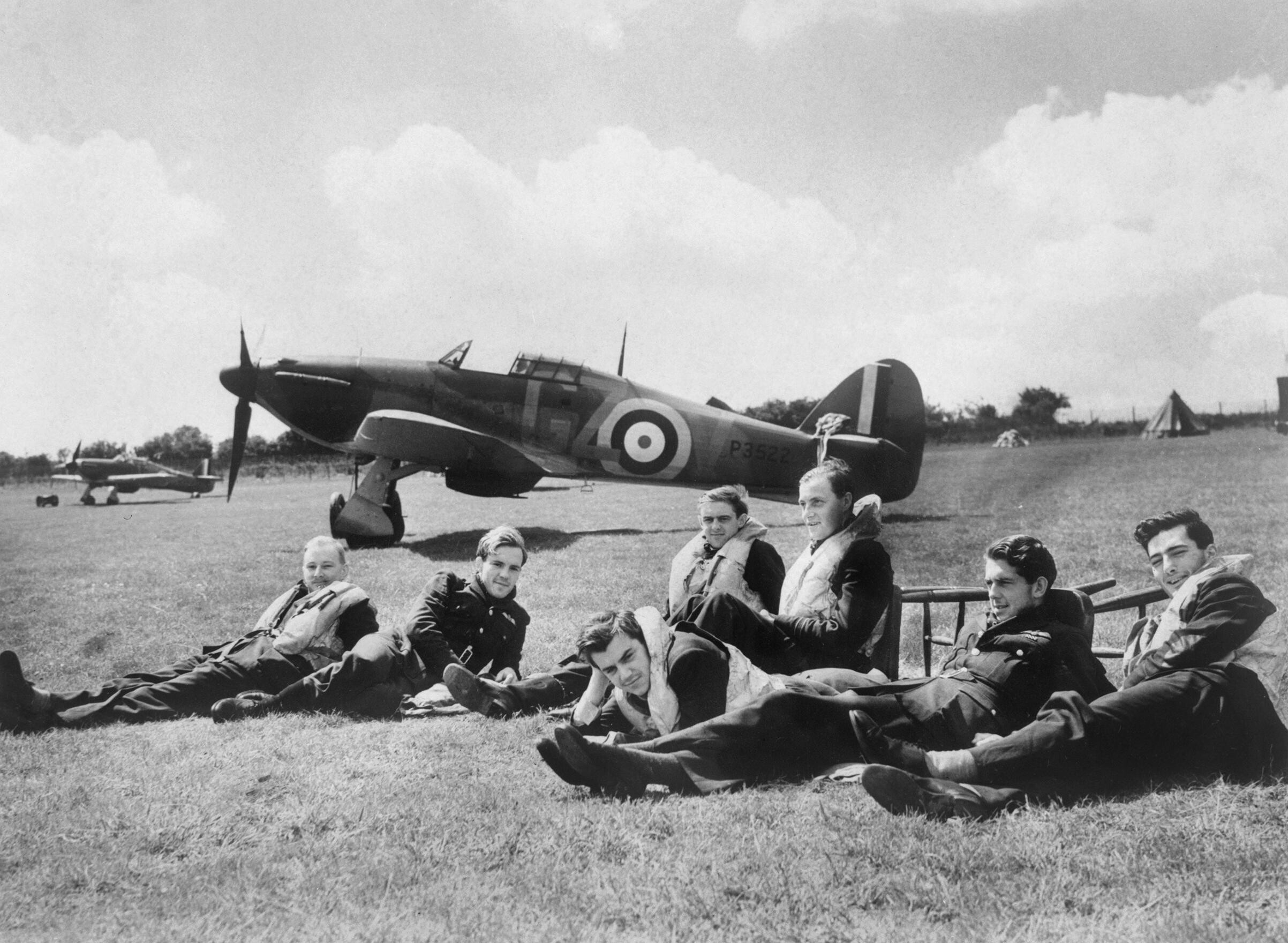
Royal Air Force (RAF) pilots during the Battle of Britain, with a Hawker Hurricane Mk I P3522 in the backdrop

During the battle, some commanders, notably Leigh-Mallory, proposed squadrons be formed into "Big Wings," consisting of at least three squadrons, to attack the enemy en masse, a method pioneered by Douglas Bader.

Proponents of this tactic claimed interceptions in large numbers caused greater enemy losses while reducing their own casualties. Opponents pointed out the big wings would take too long to form up, and the strategy ran a greater risk of fighters being caught on the ground refuelling. The big wing idea also caused pilots to overclaim their kills, due to the confusion of a more intense battle zone. This led to considerable overestimation of the effectiveness of Big Wings.

The issue caused intense friction between Park and Leigh-Mallory, as 12 Group was assigned the task of protecting 11 Group's airfields while Park's squadrons intercepted incoming raids. The delay in forming up Big Wings meant the formations often did not arrive at all or until after German bombers had hit 11 Group's airfields. Dowding, to highlight the problem of the Big Wing's performance, submitted a report compiled by Park to the Air Ministry on 15 November. In the report, he highlighted that during the period of 11 September – 31 October, the extensive use of the Big Wing had resulted in just 10 interceptions and one German aircraft destroyed, but his report was ignored. Post-war analysis agrees Dowding and Park's approach was best for 11 Group.

Dowding's removal from his post in November 1940 has been blamed on this struggle between Park and Leigh-Mallory's daylight strategy. The intensive raids and destruction wrought during the Blitz damaged both Dowding and Park in particular, because of the failure to produce an effective night-fighter defence system - something for which the influential Leigh-Mallory had long criticised them.

=== Bomber and Coastal Command contributions ===
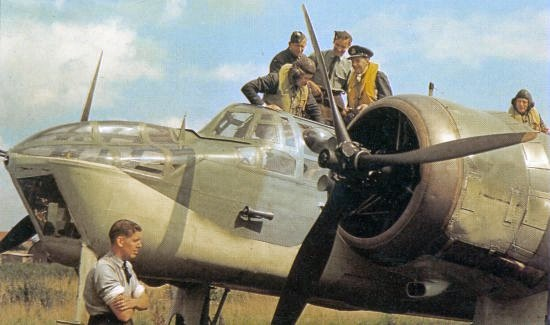
A Bristol Blenheim Mk IV of 21 Squadron

Bomber Command and Coastal Command aircraft flew offensive sorties against targets in Germany and France during the battle. An hour after the declaration of war, Bomber Command launched raids on warships and naval ports by day, and in night raids dropped leaflets as it was considered illegal to bomb targets which could affect civilians. After the initial disasters of the war, with Vickers Wellington bombers shot down in large numbers attacking Wilhelmshaven and the slaughter of the Fairey Battle squadrons sent to France, it became clear that they would have to operate mainly at night to avoid incurring very high losses. Churchill came to power on 10 May 1940, and the War Cabinet on 12 May agreed that German actions justified "unrestricted warfare", and on 14 May they authorised an attack on the night of 14/15 May against oil and rail targets in Germany. At the urging of Clement Attlee, the Cabinet on 15 May authorised a full bombing strategy against "suitable military objectives", even where there could be civilian casualties. That evening, a night time bomber campaign began against the German oil industry, communications, and forests/crops, mainly in the Ruhr area. The RAF lacked accurate night navigation and carried small bomb loads. As the threat mounted, Bomber Command changed targeting priority on 3 June 1940 to attack the German aircraft industry. On 4 July, the Air Ministry gave Bomber Command orders to attack ports and shipping. By September, the build-up of invasion barges in the Channel ports had become a top priority target.

On 7 September, the government issued a warning that the invasion could be expected within the next few days and, that night, Bomber Command attacked the Channel ports and supply dumps. On 13 September, they carried out another large raid on the Channel ports, sinking 80 large barges in the port of Ostend. 84 barges were sunk in Dunkirk after another raid on 17 September and by 19 September, almost 200 barges had been sunk. The loss of these barges may have contributed to Hitler's decision to postpone Operation Sea Lion indefinitely. The success of these raids was in part because the Germans had few Freya radar stations set up in France, so that air defences of the French harbours were not nearly as good as the air defences over Germany; Bomber Command had directed some 60% of its strength against the Channel ports.

The Bristol Blenheim units also raided German-occupied airfields throughout July to December 1940, both during daylight hours and at night. Although most of these raids were unproductive, there were some successes; on 1 August, five out of twelve Blenheims sent to attack Haamstede and Evere (Brussels) were able to destroy or heavily damage three Bf 109s of II./JG 27 and apparently kill a Staffelkapitän identified as a Hauptmann Albrecht von Ankum-Frank. (Note: Albrecht von Ankum-Frank was killed on 2 August 1940 in a crash landing at Leeuwarden Airfield.) Two other 109s were claimed by Blenheim gunners. (Note: This account is from Warner 2005, p. 253 Another source, Ramsay 1989, p. 555, lists no aircrew casualties and three 109s in total destroyed or damaged.) Another successful raid on Haamstede was made by a single Blenheim on 7 August which destroyed one 109 of 4./JG 54, heavily damaged another and caused lighter damage to four more.

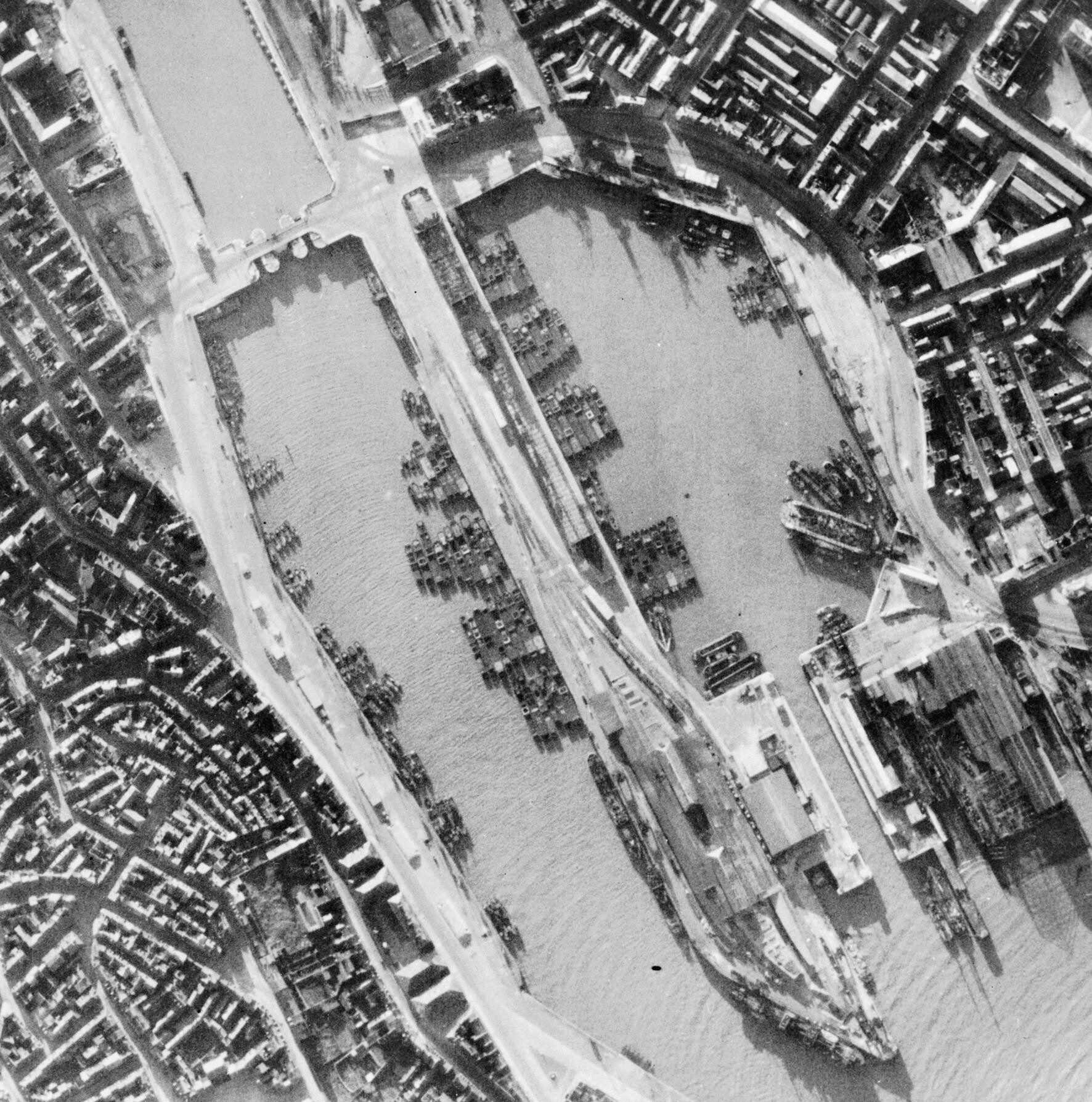
German invasion barges waiting at Boulogne Harbour, France during the Battle of Britain

There were some missions that produced an almost 100% casualty rate amongst the Blenheims; one such operation was mounted on 13 August 1940 against a Luftwaffe airfield near Aalborg in north-eastern Denmark by 12 aircraft of 82 Squadron. One Blenheim returned early (the pilot was later charged and due to appear before a court martial, but was killed on another operation); the other eleven, which reached Denmark, were shot down, five by flak and six by Bf 109s. Of the 33 crewmen who took part in the attack, 20 were killed and 13 captured.

As well as the bombing operations, Blenheim-equipped units had been formed to carry out long-range strategic reconnaissance missions over Germany and German-occupied territories. In this role, the Blenheims again proved to be too slow and vulnerable against Luftwaffe fighters, and they took constant casualties.

Coastal Command directed its attention towards the protection of British shipping, and the destruction of enemy shipping. As invasion became more likely, it participated in the strikes on French harbours and airfields, laying mines, and mounting numerous reconnaissance missions over the enemy-held coast. In all, some 9,180 sorties were flown by bombers from July to October 1940. Although this was much less than the 80,000 sorties flown by fighters, bomber crews suffered about half the total casualties borne by their fighter colleagues. The bomber contribution was, therefore, much more dangerous on a loss-per-sortie comparison.

Bomber, reconnaissance, and antisubmarine patrol operations continued throughout these months with little respite and none of the publicity accorded to Fighter Command. In his famous 20 August speech about "The Few", praising Fighter Command, Churchill also made a point of mentioning Bomber Command's contribution, adding that bombers were even then striking back at Germany; this part of the speech is often overlooked, even today. The Battle of Britain Chapel in Westminster Abbey lists in a roll of honour, 718 Bomber Command crew members, and 280 from Coastal Command who were killed between 10 July and 31 October.

Bomber and Coastal Command attacks against invasion barge concentrations in Channel ports were widely reported by the British media during September and October 1940. In what became known as 'the Battle of the Barges' RAF attacks were claimed in British propaganda to have sunk large numbers of barges, and to have created widespread chaos and disruption to German invasion preparations. Given the volume of British propaganda interest in these bomber attacks during September and earlier October, it is striking how quickly this was overlooked once the Battle of Britain had been concluded. Even by mid-war, the bomber pilots' efforts had been largely eclipsed by a continuing focus on the Few, this a result of the Air Ministry's continuing valorisation of the ″fighter boys″, beginning with the March 1941 Battle of Britain propaganda pamphlet.

=== Air-sea rescue ===
One of the biggest oversights of the entire system was the lack of adequate air-sea rescue organisation. The RAF had started organising a system in 1940 with High Speed Launches (HSLs) based on flying boat bases and at some overseas locations, but it was still believed that the amount of cross-Channel traffic meant that there was no need for a rescue service to cover these areas. Downed pilots and aircrew, it was hoped, would be picked up by any boats or ships which happened to be passing by. Otherwise, the local life boat would be alerted, assuming someone had seen the pilot going into the water.

RAF aircrew were issued with a life jacket, nicknamed the "Mae West," but in 1940 it still required manual inflation, which was almost impossible for someone who was injured or in shock. The waters of the English Channel and Dover Straits are cold, even in the middle of summer, and clothing issued to RAF aircrew did little to insulate them against these freezing conditions. The RAF also imitated the German practice of issuing fluorescein. A conference in 1939 had placed air-sea rescue under Coastal Command. Because pilots had been lost at sea during the "Channel Battle", on 22 August, control of RAF rescue launches was passed to the local naval authorities and 12 Lysanders were given to Fighter Command to help look for pilots at sea. In all, some 200 pilots and aircrew were lost at sea during the battle. No proper air-sea rescue service was formed until 1941.

== Phases of the battle ==
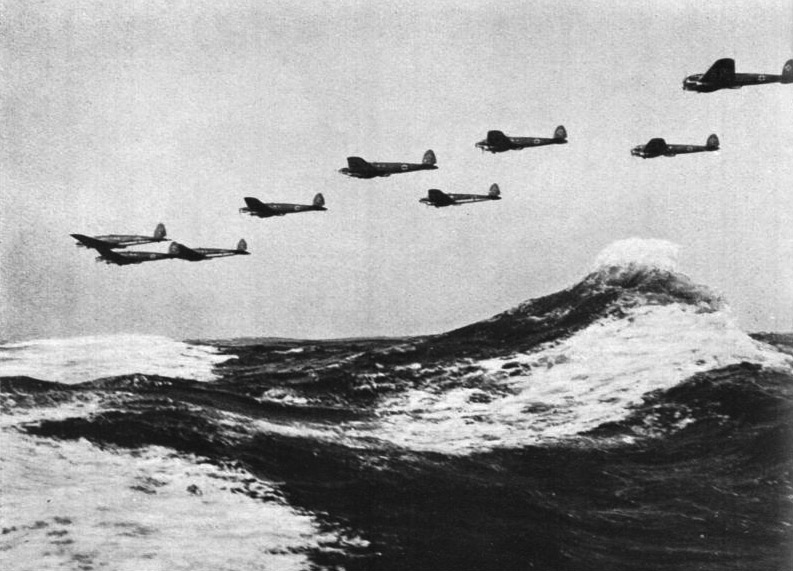
German Heinkel He 111 bombers over the English Channel 1940

The battle covered a shifting geographical area, and there have been differing opinions on significant dates: when the Air Ministry proposed 8 August as the start, Dowding responded that operations "merged into one another almost insensibly", and proposed 10 July as the onset of increased attacks. With the caution that phases drifted into each other and dates are not firm, the Royal Air Force Museum states that five main phases can be identified:

- 26 June – 16 July: Störangriffe ("nuisance raids"), scattered small scale probing attacks both day and night, armed reconnaissance and mine-laying sorties. From 4 July, daylight Kanalkampf ("the Channel battles") against shipping.
- 17 July – 12 August: daylight Kanalkampf attacks on shipping intensify through this period, increased attacks on ports and coastal airfields, night raids on RAF and aircraft manufacturing.
- 13 August – 6 September: Adlerangriff ("Eagle Attack"), the main assault; attempt to destroy the RAF in southern England, including massive daylight attacks on RAF airfields, followed from 19 August by heavy night bombing of ports and industrial cities, including suburbs of London.
- 7 September – 2 October: the Blitz commences, main focus day and night attacks on London.
- 3–31 October: large scale night bombing raids, mostly on London; daylight attacks now confined to small scale fighter-bomber Störangriffe raids luring RAF fighters into dogfights.

=== Small scale raids ===
Following Germany's rapid territorial gains in the Battle of France, the Luftwaffe had to reorganise its forces, set up bases along the coast, and rebuild after heavy losses. It began small scale bombing raids on Britain on the night of 5/6 June, and continued sporadic attacks throughout June and July. The first large-scale attack was at night, on 18/19 June, when small raids scattered between Yorkshire and Kent involved in total 100 bombers. These Störangriffe ("nuisance raids") which involved only a few aeroplanes, sometimes just one, were used to train bomber crews in both day and night attacks, to test defences and try out methods, with most flights at night. They found that, rather than carrying small numbers of large high explosive bombs, it was more effective to use more small bombs, similarly incendiaries had to cover a large area to set effective fires. These training flights continued through August and into the first week of September. Against this, the raids also gave the British time to assess the German tactics, and invaluable time for the RAF fighters and anti-aircraft defences to prepare and gain practice.

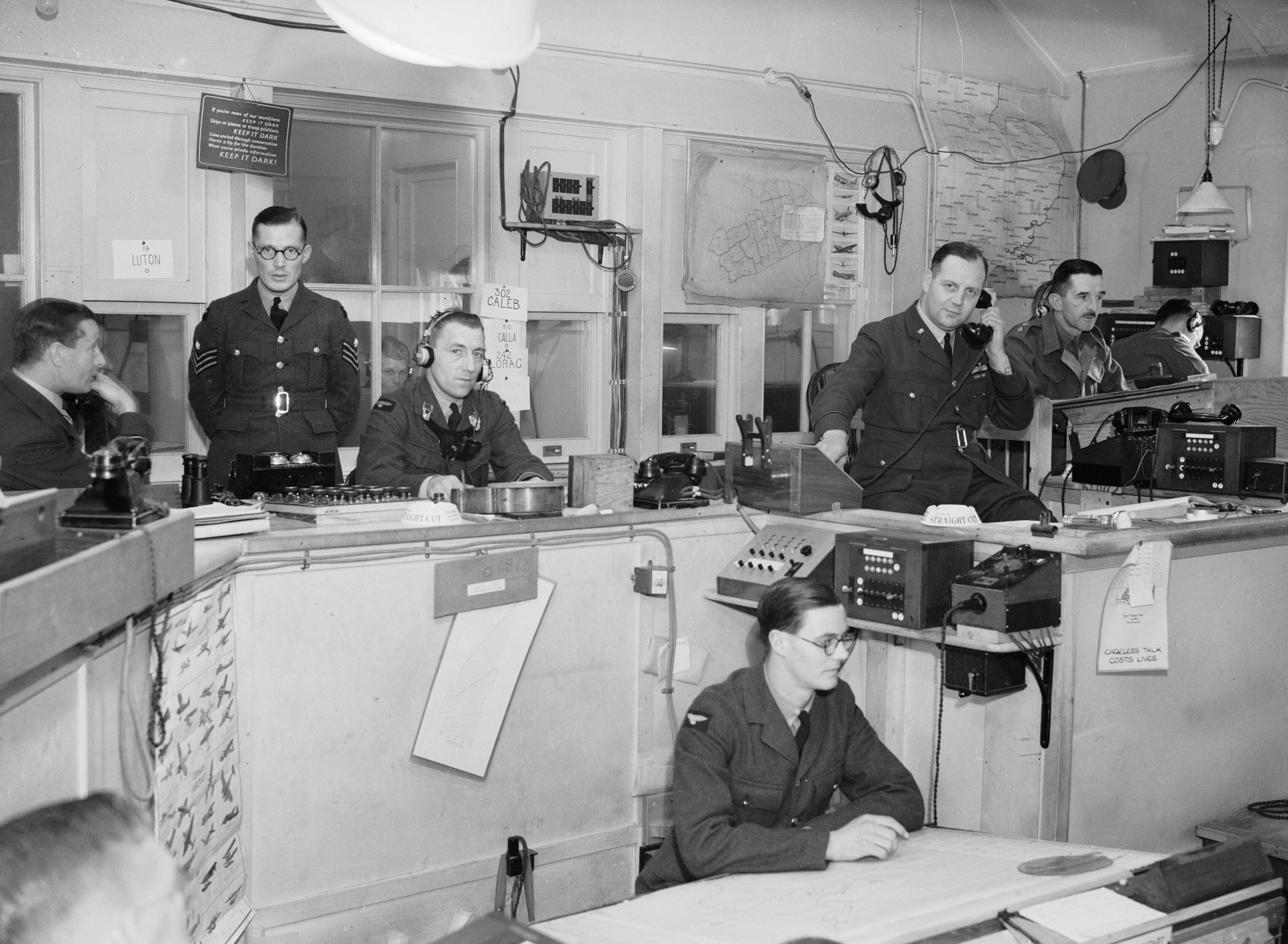
Interior of RAF Fighter Command's Sector 'G' Operations Room at Duxford, 1940

The attacks were widespread: over the night of 30 June alarms were set off in 20 counties by just 20 bombers, then next day during 1 July the first daylight raids were carried out on both Hull in Yorkshire and Wick, Caithness. On 3 July most flights were reconnaissance sorties, but 15 civilians were killed when bombs hit Guildford in Surrey. Numerous small Störangriffe raids, both day and night, were made daily through August, September and into the winter, with aims including bringing RAF fighters up to battle, destruction of specific military and economic targets, and setting off air-raid warnings to affect civilian morale: four major air-raids in August involved hundreds of bombers; in the same month 1,062 small raids were made, spread across the whole of Britain.

=== Channel battles ===
The Kanalkampf comprised a series of running fights over convoys in the English Channel. It was launched partly because Kesselring and Sperrle were not sure about what else to do, and partly because it gave German aircrews some training and a chance to probe the British defences. Dowding could provide only minimal shipping protection, and these battles off the coast tended to favour the Germans, whose bomber escorts had the advantage of altitude and outnumbered the RAF fighters. From 9 July reconnaissance probing by Dornier Do 17 bombers put a severe strain on RAF pilots and machines, with high RAF losses to Bf 109s. When nine 141 Squadron Defiants went into action on 19 July six were lost to Bf 109s before a squadron of Hurricanes intervened. On 25 July a coal convoy and escorting destroyers suffered such heavy losses to attacks by Stuka dive bombers that the Admiralty decided convoys should travel at night: the RAF shot down 16 raiders but lost 7 aircraft. By 8 August 18 coal ships and 4 destroyers had been sunk, but the Navy was determined to send a convoy of 20 ships through rather than move the coal by railway. After repeated Stuka attacks that day, six ships were badly damaged, four were sunk and only four reached their destination. The RAF lost 19 fighters and shot down 31 German aircraft. The Navy now cancelled all further convoys through the Channel and the cargo was sent by rail. Even so, these early combat encounters provided both sides with experience.

=== Main assault ===
The main attack upon the RAF's defences was code-named Adlerangriff ("Eagle Attack"). Intelligence reports gave Göring the impression that the RAF was almost defeated, and raids would attract British fighters for the Luftwaffe to shoot down. The strategy agreed on 6 August was to destroy RAF Fighter Command across the south of England in four days, then bombing of military and economic targets was to systematically extend up to the Midlands until daylight attacks could proceed unhindered over the whole of Britain, culminating in a major bombing attack on London.

==== Assault on RAF: radar and airfields ====
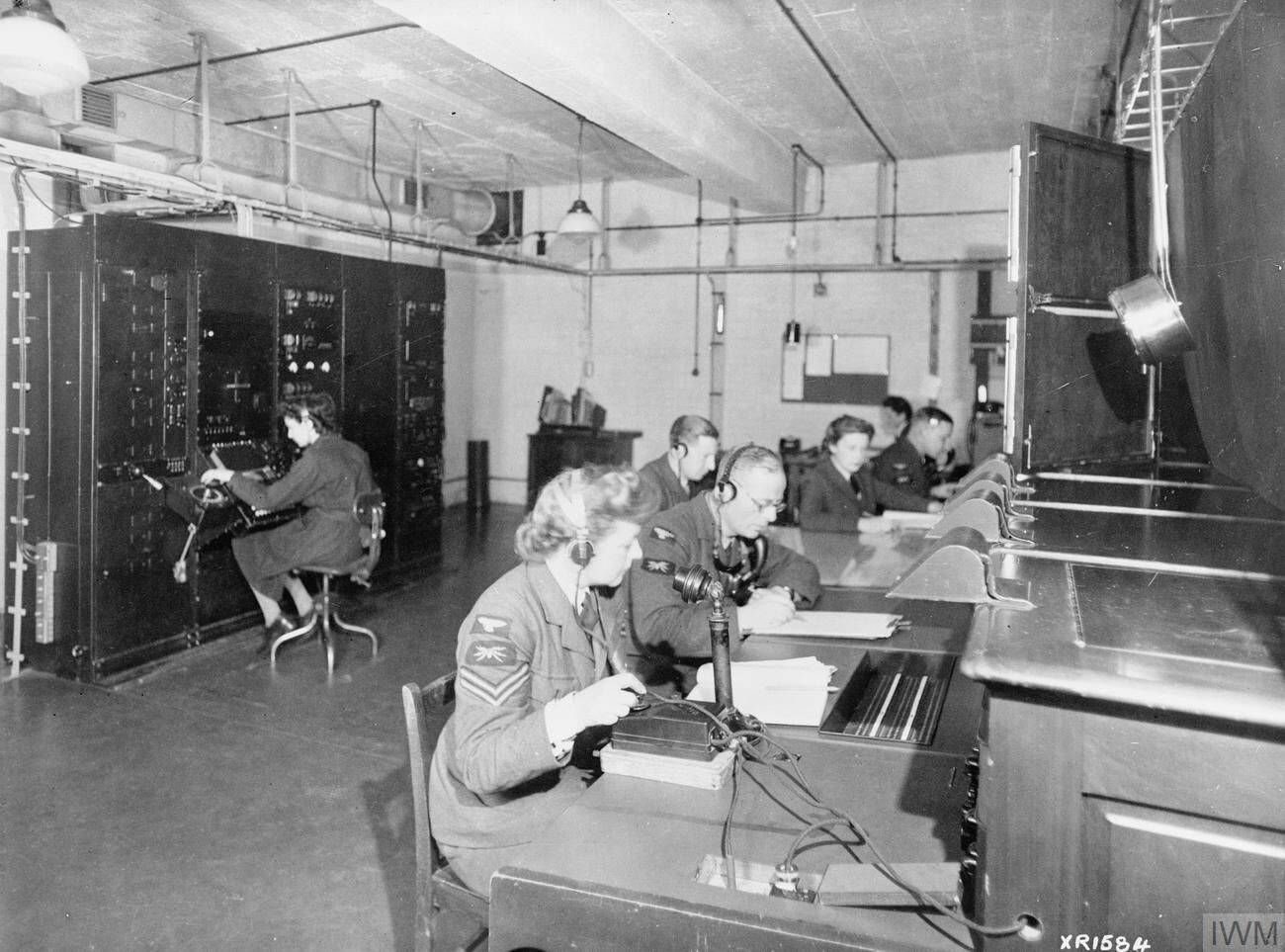
East Coast Chain Home radar operators.

Poor weather delayed Adlertag ("Eagle Day") until 13 August 1940. On 12 August, the first attempt was made to blind the Dowding system, when aircraft from the specialist fighter-bomber unit Erprobungsgruppe 210 attacked four radar stations. Three were briefly taken off the air but were back working within six hours. The raids appeared to show that British radars were difficult to knock out. The failure to mount follow-up attacks allowed the RAF to get the stations back on the air, and the Luftwaffe neglected strikes on the supporting infrastructure, such as phone lines and power stations, which could have rendered the radars useless, even if the lattice-work towers themselves, which were very difficult to destroy, remained intact.

Adlertag opened with a series of attacks, led again by Erpro 210, on coastal airfields used as forward landing grounds for the RAF fighters, as well as 'satellite airfields' (Note: "Satellite" airfields were mostly fully equipped but did not have the sector control room which allowed "Sector" airfields such as Biggin Hill to monitor and control RAF fighter formations. RAF units from Sector airfields often flew into a satellite airfield for operations during the day, returning to their home airfield in the evenings.) including Manston and Hawkinge. As the week drew on, the airfield attacks moved further inland, and repeated raids were made on the radar chain. 15 August was "The Greatest Day" when the Luftwaffe mounted the largest number of sorties of the campaign. Luftflotte 5 attacked the north of England. Raiding forces from Denmark and Norway, which believed Fighter Command strength to be concentrated in the south, ran into resistance which was unexpectedly strong. Inadequately escorted by Bf 110s, Bf109s having insufficient range to escort raids from Norway, bombers were shot down in large numbers. North East England was attacked by 65 Heinkel 111s escorted by 34 Messerschmitt 110s, and RAF Great Driffield was attacked by 50 unescorted Junkers 88s. Out of 115 bombers and 35 fighters sent, 75 planes were destroyed and many others were damaged beyond repair. Furthermore, due to early engagement by RAF fighters, many of the bombers dropped their payloads ineffectively early. As a result of these casualties, Luftflotte 5 did not appear in strength again in the campaign.

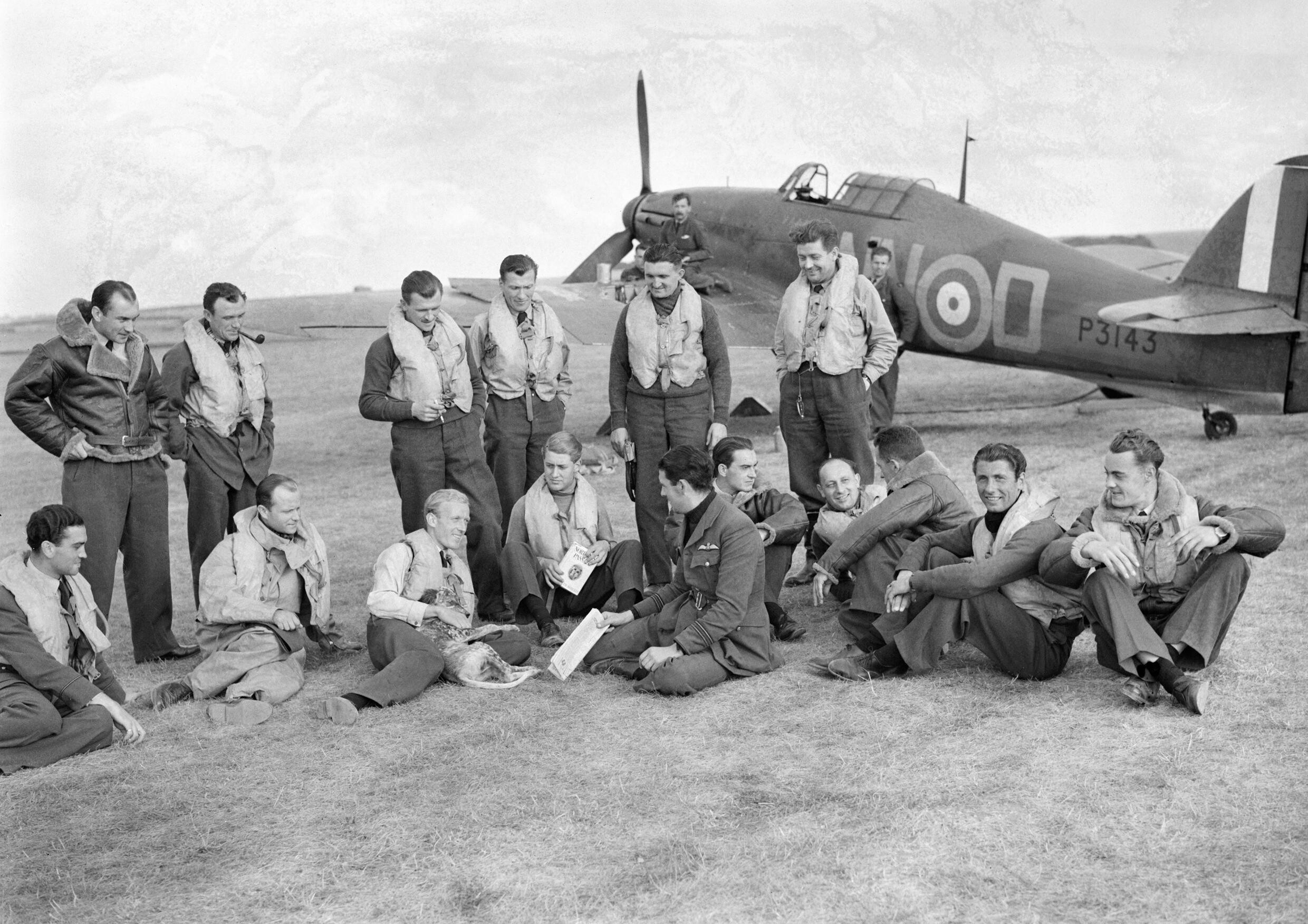
Czechoslovak fighter pilots of No. 310 Squadron RAF at RAF Duxford in 1940

18 August, which had the greatest number of casualties to both sides, has been dubbed "The Hardest Day". Following this grinding battle, exhaustion and the weather reduced operations for most of a week, allowing the Luftwaffe to review their performance. "The Hardest Day" had sounded the end for the Ju 87 in the campaign. This veteran of Blitzkrieg was too vulnerable to fighters to operate over Britain. Göring withdrew the Stuka from the fighting to preserve the Stuka force, removing the main Luftwaffe precision-bombing weapon and shifting the burden of pinpoint attacks onto the already-stretched Erpro 210. The Bf 110 proved too clumsy for dogfighting with single-engined fighters, and its participation was scaled back. It would be used only when range required it or when sufficient single-engined escort could not be provided for the bombers.

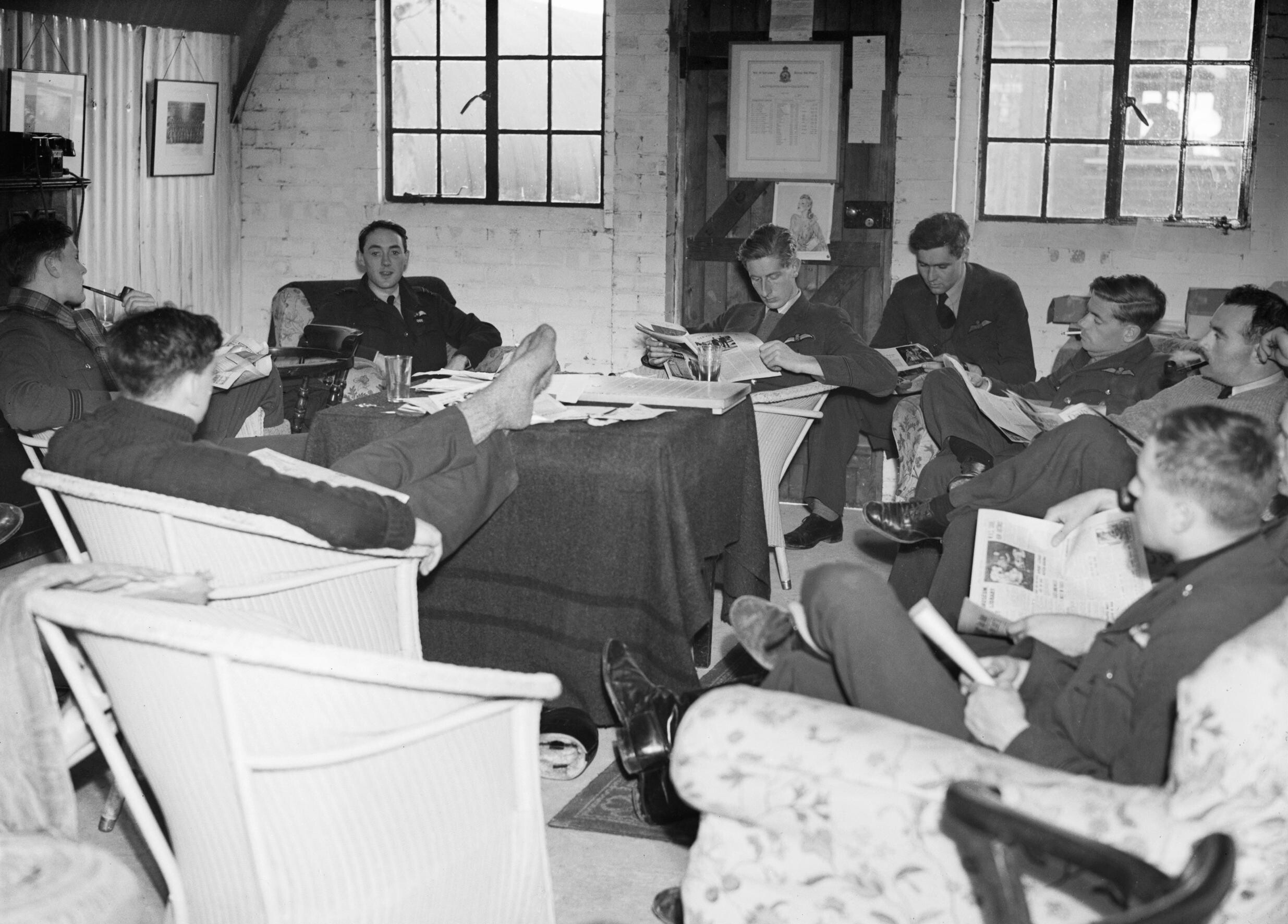
Pilots of No. 19 Squadron RAF relax in the crew room at RAF Fowlmere, 1940

Göring made yet another important decision: to order more bomber escorts at the expense of free-hunting sweeps. To achieve this, the weight of the attack now fell on Luftflotte 2, and the bulk of the Bf 109s in Luftflotte 3 were transferred to Kesselring's command, reinforcing the fighter bases in the Pas-de-Calais. Stripped of its fighters, Luftflotte 3 would concentrate on the night bombing campaign. Göring, expressing disappointment with the fighter performance thus far in the campaign, also made sweeping changes in the command structure of the fighter units, replacing many Geschwaderkommodore with younger, more aggressive pilots such as Adolf Galland and Werner Mölders.

Finally, Göring stopped the attacks on the radar chain. These were seen as unsuccessful, and neither the Reichsmarschall nor his subordinates realised how vital the Chain Home stations were to the defence systems. It was known that radar provided some early warning of raids, but the belief among German fighter pilots was that anything bringing up the "Tommies" to fight was to be encouraged.

==== Raids on British cities ====
On the afternoon of 15 August, Hauptmann Walter Rubensdörffer leading Erprobungsgruppe 210 mistakenly bombed Croydon airfield (on the outskirts of London) instead of the intended target, RAF Kenley. German intelligence reports made the Luftwaffe optimistic that the RAF, thought to be dependent on local air control, was struggling with supply problems and pilot losses. After a raid on Biggin Hill on 18 August, Luftwaffe aircrew said they had been unopposed, the airfield was "completely destroyed", and asked, "Is England already finished?" In accordance with the strategy agreed on 6 August, defeat of the RAF was to be followed by bombing military and economic targets, systematically extending up to the Midlands.

Göring ordered attacks on aircraft factories on 19 August 1940. Sixty raids on the night of 19/20 August targeted the aircraft industry and harbours, and bombs fell on suburban areas around London: Croydon, Wimbledon and the Maldens. Night raids were made on 21/22 August on Aberdeen, Bristol and South Wales. That morning, bombs were dropped on Harrow and Wealdstone, on the outskirts of London. Overnight on 22/23 August, the output of an aircraft factory at Filton near Bristol was drastically affected by a raid in which Ju 88 bombers dropped over 16 long tons (16 t) of high explosive bombs. On the night of 23/24 August over 200 bombers attacked the Fort Dunlop tyre factory in Birmingham, with a significant effect on production. A bombing campaign began on 24 August with the largest raid so far, killing 100 in Portsmouth, and that night, several areas of London were bombed; the East End was set ablaze and bombs landed on central London. Some historians believe that these bombs were dropped accidentally by a group of Heinkel He 111s which had failed to find their target and overshot Rochester and Thameshaven; this account has been contested as being three separate drops that night.

More night raids were made around London on 24/25 August, when bombs fell on Croydon, Banstead, Lewisham, Uxbridge, Harrow and Hayes. London was on red alert over the night of 28/29 August, with bombs reported in Finchley, St Pancras, Wembley, Wood Green, Southgate, Old Kent Road, Mill Hill, Ilford, Chigwell and Hendon.

==== Attacks on airfields from 24 August ====
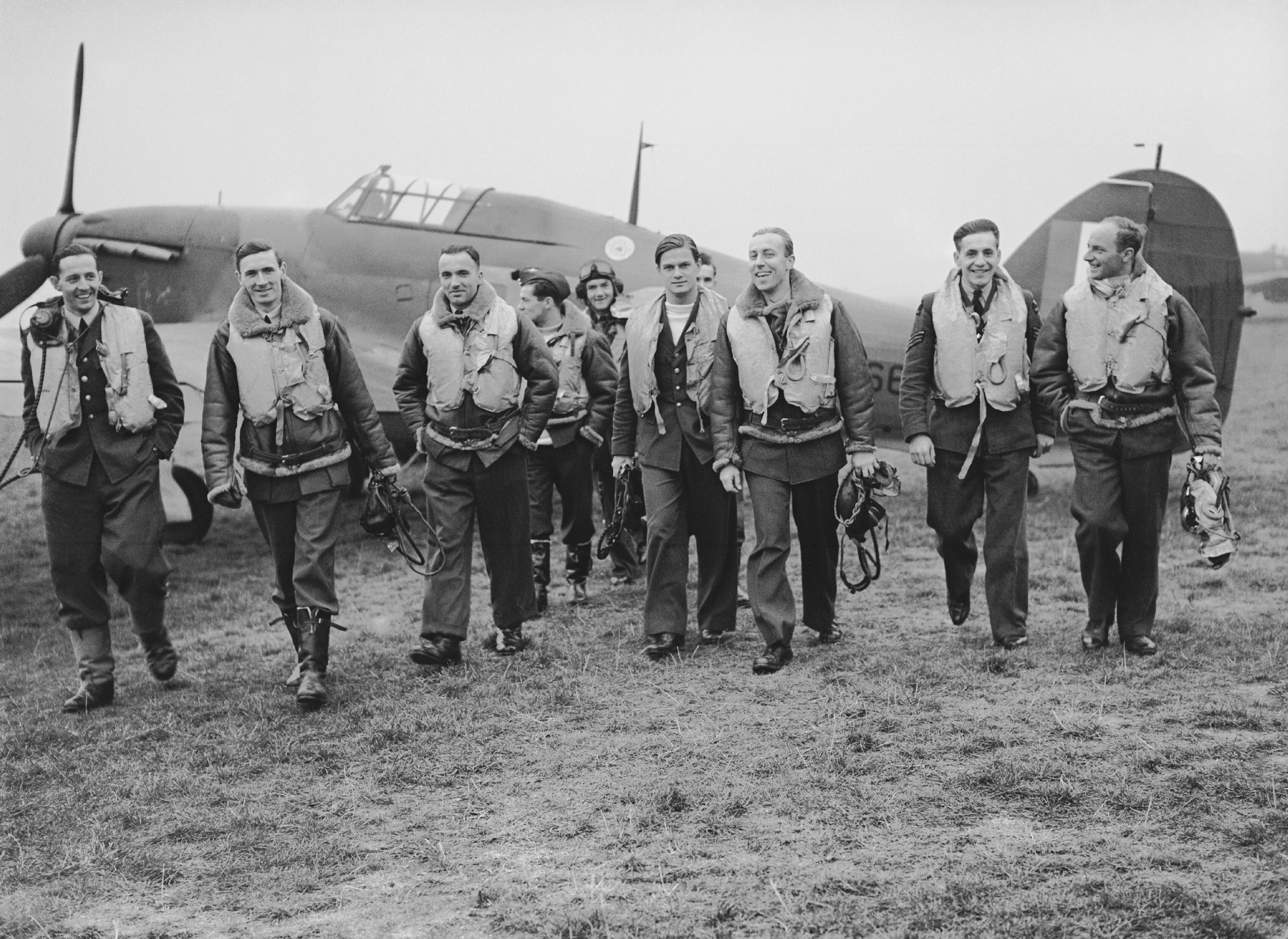
Polish 303 Squadron pilots, 1940. Left to right: P/O Ferić, Flt Lt Kent, F/O Grzeszczak, P/O Radomski, P/O Zumbach, P/O Łokuciewski, F/O Henneberg, Sgt. Rogowski, Sgt. Szaposznikow.

Göring's directive issued on 23 August 1940 ordered ceaseless attacks on the aircraft industry and on RAF ground organisation to force the RAF to use its fighters, continuing the tactic of luring them up to be destroyed, and added that focused attacks were to be made on RAF airfields.

From 24 August onwards, the battle was a fight between Kesselring's Luftflotte 2 and Park's 11 Group. The Luftwaffe concentrated all their strength on knocking out Fighter Command and made repeated attacks on the airfields. Of the 33 heavy attacks in the following two weeks, 24 were against airfields. The key sector stations were hit repeatedly: Biggin Hill and Hornchurch four times each; Debden and North Weald twice each. Croydon, Gravesend, Rochford, Hawkinge and Manston were also attacked in strength. Coastal Command's Eastchurch was bombed at least seven times because it was believed to be a Fighter Command aerodrome. At times these raids caused some damage to the sector stations, threatening the integrity of the Dowding system.

To offset some losses, some 58 Fleet Air Arm fighter pilot volunteers were seconded to RAF squadrons, and a similar number of former Fairey Battle pilots were used. Most replacements from Operational Training Units (OTUs) had as little as nine hours flying time and no gunnery or air-to-air combat training. At this point, the multinational nature of Fighter Command came to the fore. Many squadrons and personnel from the air forces of the Dominions were already attached to the RAF, including top-level commanders – Australians, Canadians, New Zealanders, Rhodesians and South Africans. Other nationalities were also represented, including Free French, Belgian and a Jewish pilot from the British mandate of Palestine.

They were bolstered by the arrival of fresh Czechoslovak and Polish squadrons. These had been held back by Dowding, who thought non-English speaking aircrew would have trouble working within his control system, but Polish and Czech fliers proved to be especially effective. The pre-war Polish Air Force had lengthy and extensive training, and high standards; with Poland conquered and under brutal German occupation, the pilots of No. 303 (Polish) Squadron, which became the highest-scoring Allied unit, were experienced and strongly motivated. Josef František, a Czech regular airman who had flown from the occupation of his own country to join the Polish and then French air forces before arriving in Britain, flew as a guest of 303 Squadron and was ultimately credited with the highest "RAF score" in the Battle of Britain.

The RAF had the advantage of fighting over home territory. Pilots who bailed out after being shot down could be back at their airfields within hours, and aircraft low on fuel or ammunition could be immediately re-equipped. One RAF pilot interviewed in late 1940 had been shot down five times during the Battle of Britain, but was able to crash-land in Britain or bail out each time. For Luftwaffe aircrews, a bailout or crash landing in England meant capture – in the critical August period, almost as many Luftwaffe pilots were taken prisoner as were killed – while parachuting into the English Channel often meant drowning. Morale began to suffer, and Kanalkrankheit ("Channel sickness") – a form of combat fatigue – began to appear among the German pilots. Their replacement problem became worse than the British.

==== Assessment of attempt to destroy the RAF ====
The effect of the German attacks on airfields is unclear. According to Stephen Bungay, Dowding, in a letter to Hugh Trenchard accompanying Park's report on the period 8 August – 10 September 1940, states that the Luftwaffe "achieved very little" in the last week of August and the first week of September. The only Sector Station to be shut down operationally was Biggin Hill, and it was non-operational for just two hours. Dowding admitted that 11 Group's efficiency was impaired but, despite serious damage to some airfields, only two out of 13 heavily attacked airfields were down for more than a few hours. The German refocus on London was not critical.

Retired Air Vice-Marshal Peter Dye, head of the RAF Museum, discussed the logistics of the battle in 2000 and 2010, dealing specifically with the single-seat fighters. He said that not only was British aircraft production replacing aircraft, but replacement pilots were keeping pace with losses. The number of pilots in RAF Fighter Command increased during July, August and September. The figures indicate the number of pilots available never decreased: from July, 1,200 were available; from 1 August, 1,400; in September, over 1,400; in October, nearly 1,600; by 1 November, 1,800. Throughout the battle, the RAF had more fighter pilots available than the Luftwaffe. Although the RAF's reserves of single-seat fighters fell during July, the wastage was made up for by an efficient Civilian Repair Organisation (CRO), which by December had repaired and put back into service some 4,955 aircraft, and by aircraft held at Air Servicing Unit (ASU) airfields.

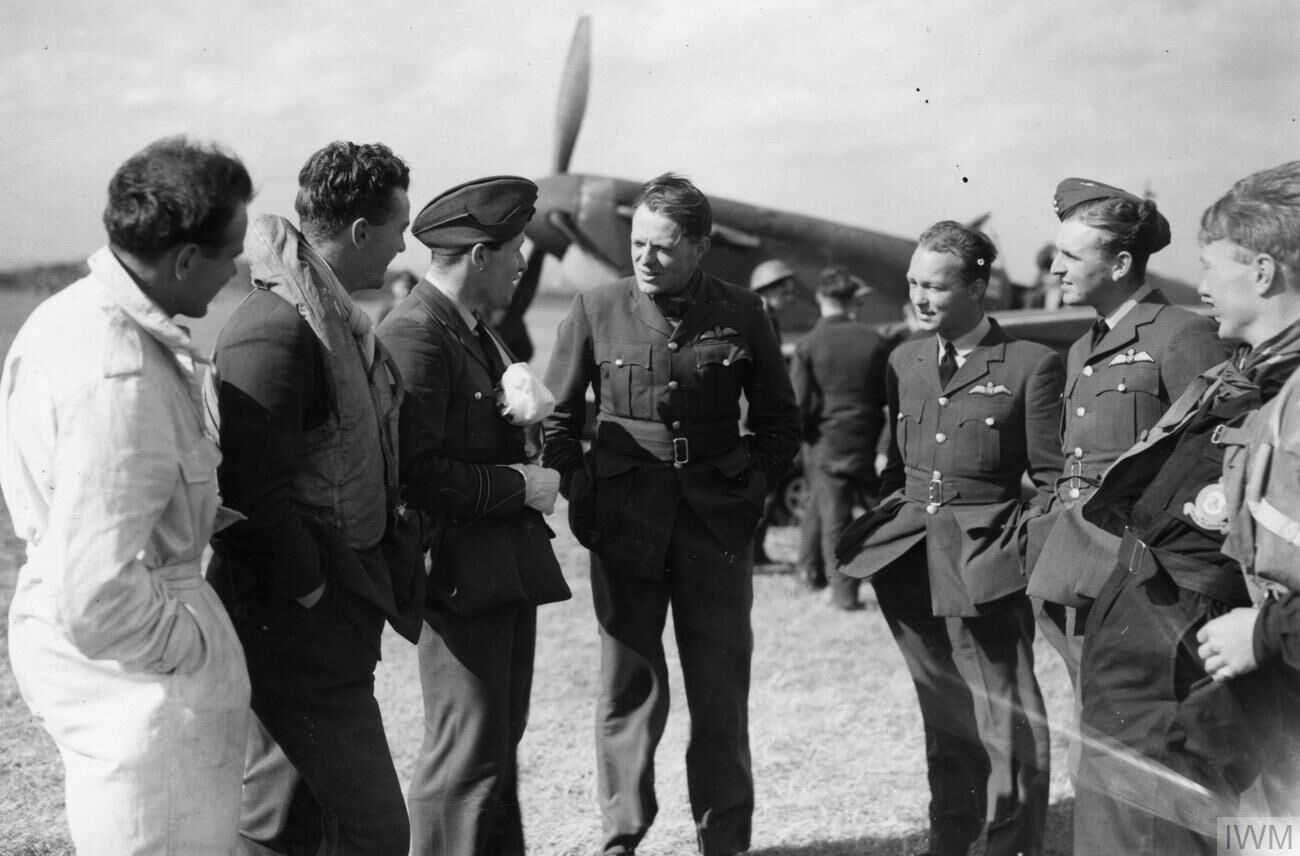
Pilots of No. 66 Squadron at Gravesend, September 1940

Richard Overy agrees with Dye and Bungay. Overy says that only one airfield was temporarily put out of action and "only" 103 pilots were lost. British fighter production, not counting repaired aircraft, produced 496 new aircraft in July, 467 in August, and 467 in September, covering the losses of August and September. Overy indicates the number of serviceable and total strength returns reveal an increase in fighters from 3 August to 7 September, 1,061 on strength and 708 serviceable to 1,161 on strength and 746 serviceable. Moreover, Overy points out that the number of RAF fighter pilots grew by one-third between June and August 1940. Personnel records show a constant supply of around 1,400 pilots in the crucial weeks of the battle. In the second half of September it reached 1,500. The shortfall of pilots was never above 10%. The Germans never had more than between 1,100 and 1,200 pilots, a deficiency of up to one-third. "If Fighter Command were 'the few', the German fighter pilots were fewer".

Other scholars assert that this period was the most dangerous of all. In The Narrow Margin, published in 1961, historians Derek Wood and Derek Dempster believed that the two weeks from 24 August to 6 September represented a real danger. According to them, from 24 August to 6 September 295 fighters had been totally destroyed and 171 badly damaged, against a total output of 269 new and repaired Spitfires and Hurricanes. They say that 103 pilots were killed or missing and 128 were wounded, a total wastage of 120 pilots per week out of a fighting strength of just under 1,000, and that during August no more than 260 fighter pilots were turned out by OTUs, while casualties were just over 300. A full squadron establishment was 26 pilots, whereas the average in August was 16. In their assessment, the RAF was losing the battle. Denis Richards, in his 1953 contribution to the official British account History of the Second World War, agreed that lack of pilots, especially experienced ones, was the RAF's greatest problem. He states that between 8 and 18 August 154 RAF pilots were killed, severely wounded, or missing, while only 63 new pilots were trained. Availability of aircraft was also a serious issue. While its reserves during the Battle of Britain never declined to a half dozen planes as some later claimed, Richards describes 24 August to 6 September as the critical period because during these two weeks Germany destroyed far more aircraft through its attacks on 11 Group's southeast bases than Britain was producing. Three more weeks of such a pace would indeed have exhausted aircraft reserves. Germany had also suffered heavy losses of pilots and aircraft, hence its shift to night-time attacks in September. On 7 September RAF aircraft losses fell below British production and remained so until the end of the war.

=== Day and night attacks on London: start of the Blitz ===
Calais, September 1940. Göring giving a speech to pilots about the change in tactics: to bomb London instead of the airfields

Hitler's "Directive No. 17 – For the conduct of air and sea warfare against England" issued on 1 August 1940, reserved to himself the right to decide on terror attacks as measures of reprisal. Hitler issued a directive that London was not to be bombed save on his sole instruction. In preparation, detailed target plans under the code name Operation Loge for raids on communications, power stations, armaments works and docks in the Port of London were distributed to the Fliegerkorps in July. The port areas were crowded next to residential housing and civilian casualties would be expected, but this would combine military and economic targets with indirect effects on morale. The strategy agreed on 6 August was for raids on military and economic targets in towns and cities to culminate in a major attack on London. In mid-August, raids were made on targets on the outskirts of London.

Luftwaffe doctrine included the possibility of retaliatory attacks on cities, and since 11 May small-scale night raids by RAF Bomber Command had frequently bombed residential areas. The Germans assumed this was deliberate, and as the raids increased in frequency and scale the population grew impatient for measures of revenge. On 25 August 1940, 81 bombers of Bomber Command were sent out to raid industrial and commercial targets in Berlin. Clouds prevented accurate identification and the bombs fell across the city, causing casualties among the civilian population as well as damage to residential areas. Continuing RAF raids on Berlin led to Hitler withdrawing his directive on 30 August, and giving the go-ahead to the planned bombing offensive. On 3 September Göring planned to bomb London daily, with General Albert Kesselring's enthusiastic support, having received reports the average strength of RAF squadrons was down to five or seven fighters out of twelve and their airfields in the area were out of action. Hitler issued a directive on 5 September to attack cities including London. In a widely publicised speech delivered on 4 September 1940, Hitler condemned the bombing of Berlin and presented the planned attacks on London as reprisals. The first daylight raid was titled Vergeltungsangriff (revenge attack).

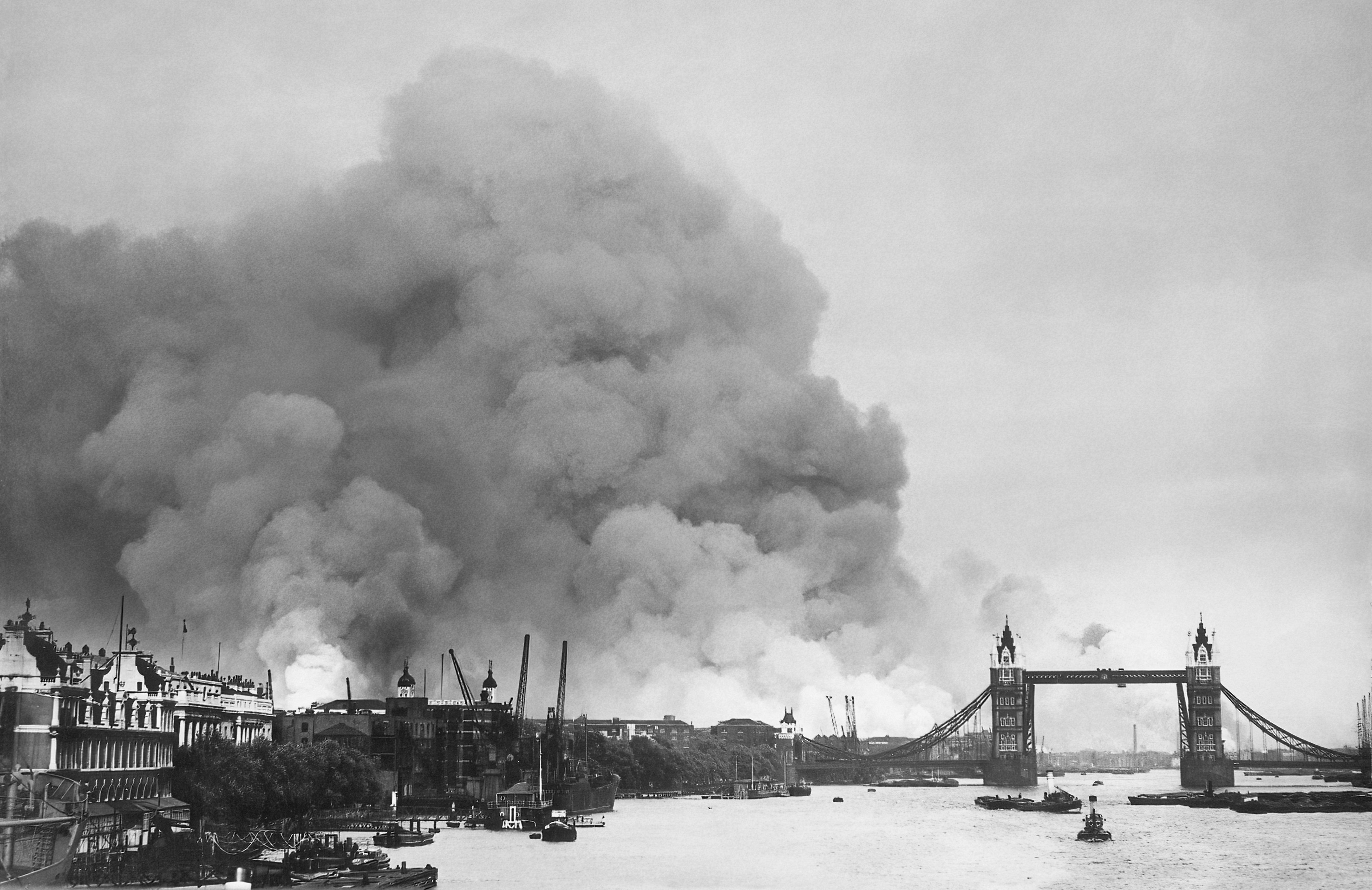
Smoke rising from fires in the London docks, following bombing on 7 September

On 7 September, a massive series of raids involving nearly four hundred bombers and more than six hundred fighters targeted docks in the East End of London, day and night. The RAF anticipated attacks on airfields, and 11 Group rose to meet them, in greater numbers than the Luftwaffe expected. The first official deployment of 12 Group's Leigh-Mallory's Big Wing took twenty minutes to form up, missing its intended target, but encountering another formation of bombers while still climbing. They returned, apologetic about their limited success, and blamed the delay on being scrambled too late.

The German press jubilantly announced that "one great cloud of smoke stretches tonight from the middle of London to the mouth of the Thames." Reports reflected the briefings given to crews before the raids – "Everyone knew about the last cowardly attacks on German cities, and thought about wives, mothers and children. And then came that word 'Vengeance!'" Pilots reported seeing ruined airfields as they flew towards London, appearances which gave intelligence reports the impression of devastated defences. Göring maintained that the RAF was close to defeat, making invasion feasible.

Fighter Command had been at its lowest ebb, short of men and machines, and the break from airfield attacks allowed them to recover. 11 Group had considerable success in breaking up daytime raids. 12 Group repeatedly disobeyed orders and failed to meet requests to protect 11 Group airfields, but their experiments with increasingly large Big Wings had some success. The Luftwaffe began to abandon their morning raids, with attacks on London starting late in the afternoon for fifty-seven consecutive nights.

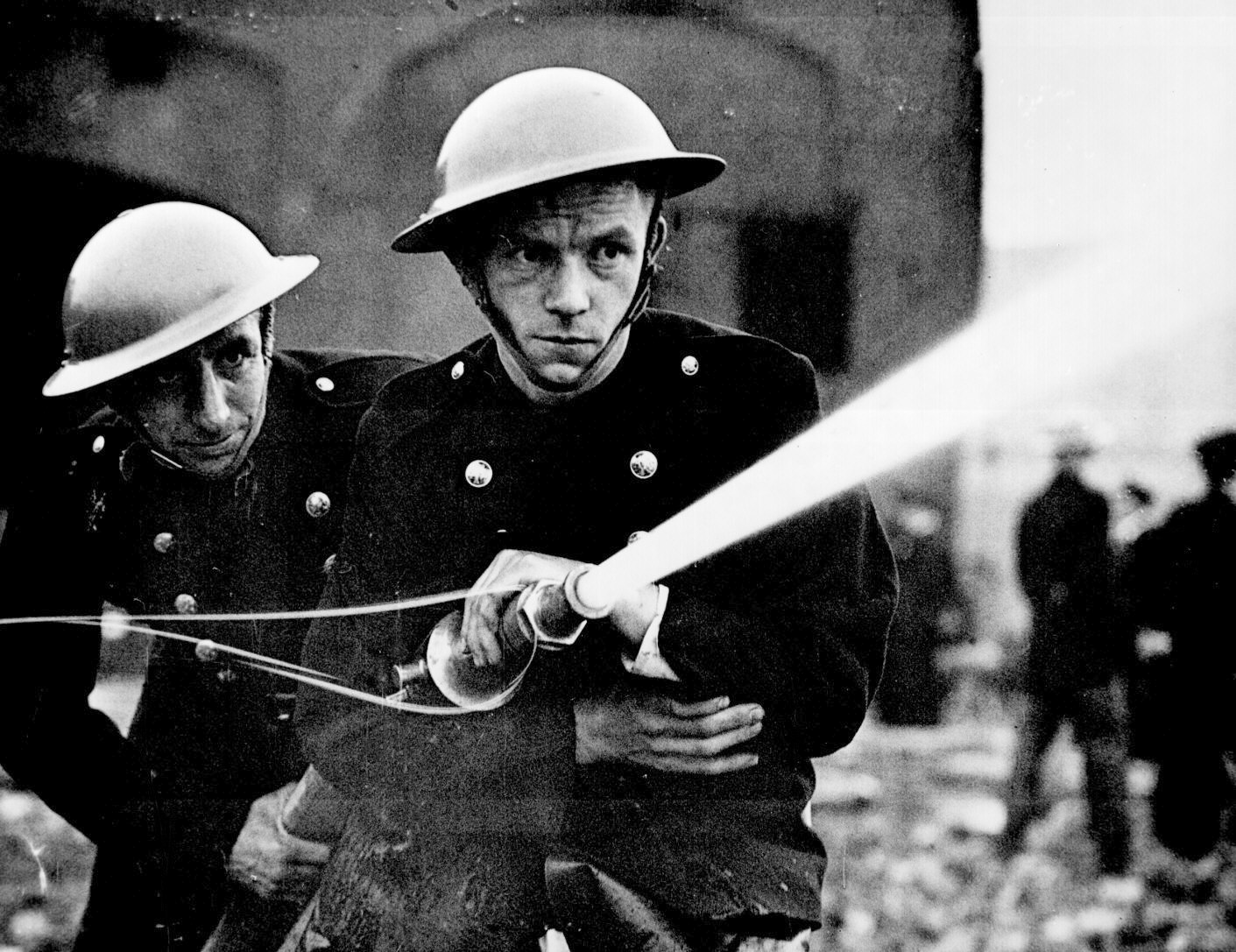
Members of the London Auxiliary Firefighting Service

The most damaging aspect to the Luftwaffe of targeting London was the increased distance. The Bf 109E escorts had a limited fuel capacity, giving them only a 660 km (410-mile) maximum range solely on internal fuel, and when they arrived had only 10 minutes of flying time before turning for home, leaving the bombers undefended. Its eventual stablemate, the Focke-Wulf Fw 190A, was flying only in prototype form in mid-1940; the first 28 Fw 190s were not delivered until November 1940. The Fw 190A-1 had a maximum range of 940 km (584 miles) on internal fuel, 40% greater than the Bf 109E. The Messerschmitt Bf 109E-7 corrected this deficiency by adding a ventral centre-line ordnance rack to take either an SC 250 bomb or a standard 300-litre Luftwaffe drop tank to double the range to 1,325 km (820 mi). The ordnance rack was not retrofitted to earlier Bf 109Es until October 1940.

On 14 September, Hitler chaired a meeting with the OKW staff. Göring was in France directing the decisive battle, so Erhard Milch deputised for him. Hitler asked "Should we call it off altogether?" General Hans Jeschonnek, Luftwaffe Chief of Staff, begged for a last chance to defeat the RAF and for permission to launch attacks on civilian residential areas to cause mass panic. Hitler refused the latter, perhaps unaware of how much damage had already been done to civilian targets. He reserved for himself the power to unleash the terror weapon. Instead, political will was to be broken by destroying the material infrastructure, the weapons industry, and stocks of fuel and food.

On 15 September, two massive waves of German attacks were decisively repulsed by the RAF by deploying every aircraft in 11 Group. Sixty German and twenty-six RAF aircraft were shot down. The action was the climax of the Battle of Britain.

Two days after this German defeat Hitler postponed preparations for the invasion of Britain. Henceforth, in the face of mounting losses in men, aircraft and the lack of adequate replacements, the Luftwaffe completed their gradual shift from daylight bomber raids and continued with nighttime bombing. 15 September is commemorated as Battle of Britain Day.

=== Night time Blitz, fighter-bomber day raids ===
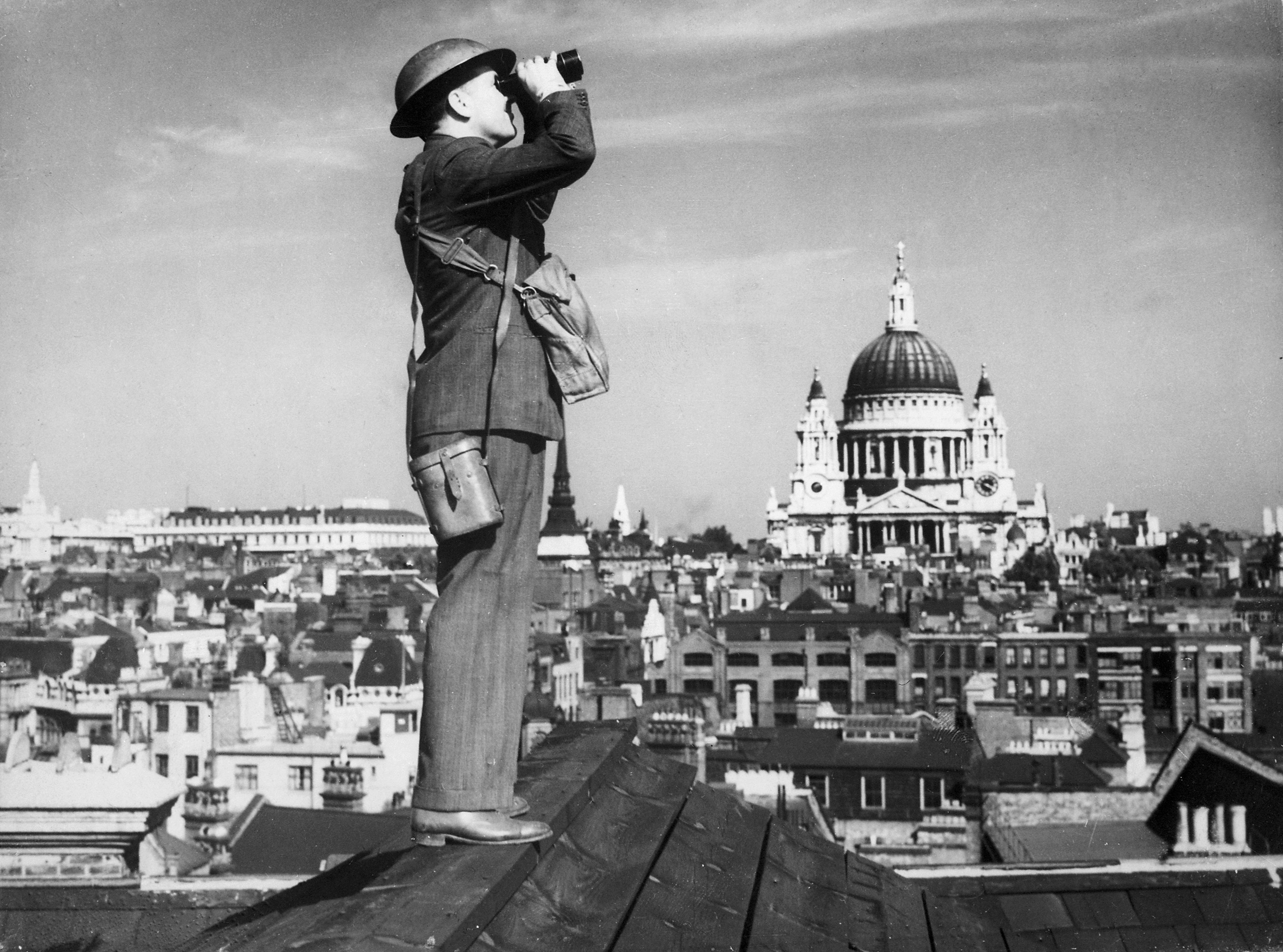
Observer Corps spotter scans the skies of London.

At the 14 September OKW conference, Hitler acknowledged that the Luftwaffe had still not gained the air superiority needed for the Operation Sea Lion invasion. In agreement with Raeder's written recommendation, Hitler said the campaign was to intensify regardless of invasion plans: "The decisive thing is the ceaseless continuation of air attacks." Jeschonnek proposed attacking residential areas to cause "mass panic", but Hitler turned this down: he reserved to himself the option of terror bombing. British morale was to be broken by destroying infrastructure, armaments manufacturing, fuel and food stocks. On 16 September, Göring gave the order for this change in strategy. This new phase was to be the first independent strategic bombing campaign, in hopes of a political success forcing the British to give up. Hitler hoped it might result in "eight million going mad" (referring to the population of London in 1940), which would "cause a catastrophe" for the British. In those circumstances, Hitler said, "even a small invasion might go a long way". Hitler was against cancelling the invasion as "the cancellation would reach the ears of the enemy and strengthen his resolve". (Note: Irving 1974, pp. 118–119: Irving's sources were General Franz Halder and the OKW War Diary for 14 September 1940. Keitel's notes, ND 803-PS, record the same.) (Note: Bungay refers to the 14 September meeting with Milch and Jeschonnek. Hitler wanted to keep up the "moral" pressure on the British Government, in the hope it would crack. Bungay indicates that Hitler had changed his mind from the day before, refusing to call off the invasion for the time being.) On 19 September, Hitler ordered a reduction in work on Operation Sea Lion. He doubted if strategic bombing could achieve its aims, but ending the air war would be an open admission of defeat. He had to maintain the appearance of concentration on defeating Britain, to conceal from Joseph Stalin his covert aim to invade the Soviet Union.

Throughout the battle, most Luftwaffe bombing raids had been at night. They increasingly suffered unsustainable losses in daylight raids, and the last massive daytime attacks were on 15 September. A raid of 70 bombers on 18 September also suffered badly, and day raids were gradually phased out leaving the main attacks at night. Fighter Command still lacked any effective capacity to intercept night-time raiders. The night fighters, mostly Blenheims and Beaufighters, at this time lacked airborne radar and so could not find the bombers. Anti-aircraft guns were diverted to London's defences, but had a much-reduced success rate against night attacks.

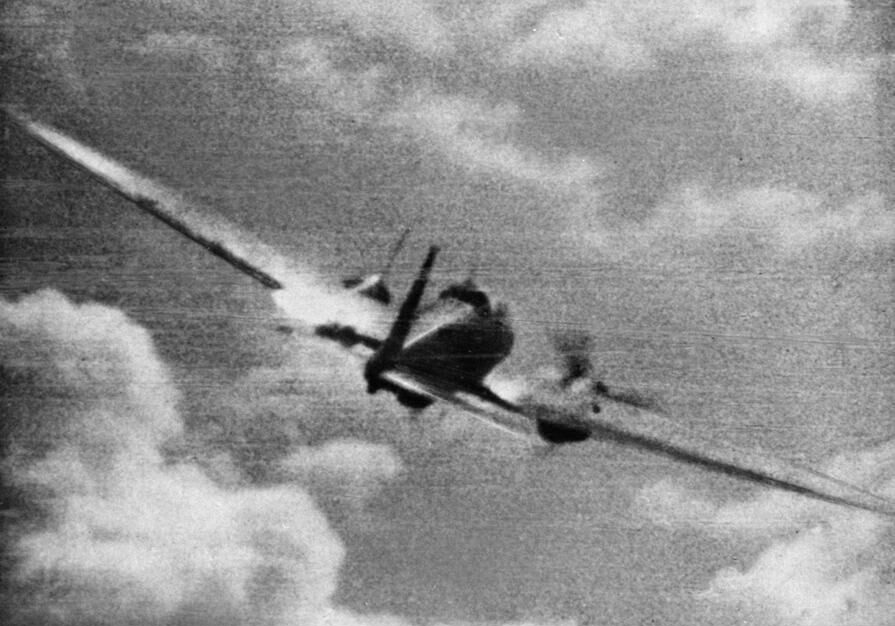
A still from camera gun footage taken from a Supermarine Spitfire Mark I of No. 609 Squadron RAF attacking a Heinkel HE 111

From mid September, Luftwaffe daylight bombing was gradually taken over by Bf 109 fighters, adapted to take one 250 kg bomb. Small groups of fighter-bombers would carry out Störangriffe raids escorted by large escort formations of about 200 to 300 combat fighters. They flew at altitudes over 20,000 feet (6,100 m) where the Bf 109 had an advantage over RAF fighters, except the Spitfire. (Note: Jeffrey Quill wrote of his combat experience whilst flying with No. 65 Squadron: Nearly all our engagements with Me 109s took place at around 20,000 – 25,000 ft. The Spitfire had the edge over them in speed and climb, and particularly in turning circle. (...) One engagement with several Me 109s at about 25,000 ft over the Channel sticks in my memory...I was now convinced that the Spitfire Mk I could readily out-turn the 109, certainly in the 20,000 ft region and probably at all heights.) (Note: Bf 109 leaking valves, supercharger faults/failure.) The raids disturbed civilians, and continued the war of attrition against Fighter Command. The raids were intended to carry out precision bombing on military or economic targets, but it was hard to achieve sufficient accuracy with the single bomb. Sometimes, when attacked, the fighter-bombers had to jettison the bomb to function as fighters. The RAF was at a disadvantage and changed defensive tactics by introducing standing patrols of Spitfires at high altitude to monitor incoming raids. On a sighting, other patrols at lower altitude would fly up to join the battle.

A Junkers Ju 88 returning from a raid on London was shot down in Kent on 27 September resulting in the Battle of Graveney Marsh, the last action between British and foreign military forces on British mainland soil.

German bombing of Britain reached its peak in October and November 1940. In post-war interrogation, Wilhelm Keitel described the aims as economic blockade, in conjunction with submarine warfare, and attrition of Britain's military and economic resources. The Luftwaffe wanted to achieve victory on its own and was reluctant to cooperate with the navy. Their strategy for the blockade was to destroy ports and storage facilities in towns and cities. Priorities were based on the pattern of trade and distribution, so for these months, London was the main target. In November their attention turned to other ports and industrial targets around Britain.

Hitler postponed the Sealion invasion on 13 October "until the spring of 1941". It was not until Hitler's Directive 21 was issued, on 18 December 1940, that the threat to Britain of invasion finally ended.

During the battle, and for the rest of the war, an important factor in keeping public morale high was the continued presence in London of King George VI and his wife Queen Elizabeth. When war broke out in 1939, the King and Queen decided to stay in London and not flee to Canada, as had been suggested. (Note: This proposal has since been confused, or conflated, with a possible flight by HMG in exile.) George VI and Elizabeth officially stayed in Buckingham Palace throughout the war, although they often spent weekends at Windsor Castle to visit their daughters, Elizabeth (the future queen) and Margaret. Buckingham Palace was damaged by bombs which landed in the grounds on 10 September and, on 13 September, more serious damage was caused by two bombs which destroyed the Royal Chapel. The royal couple were in a small sitting room about 80 yards from where the bombs exploded. On 24 September, in recognition of the bravery of civilians, King George VI inaugurated the award of the George Cross.

== Attrition statistics ==
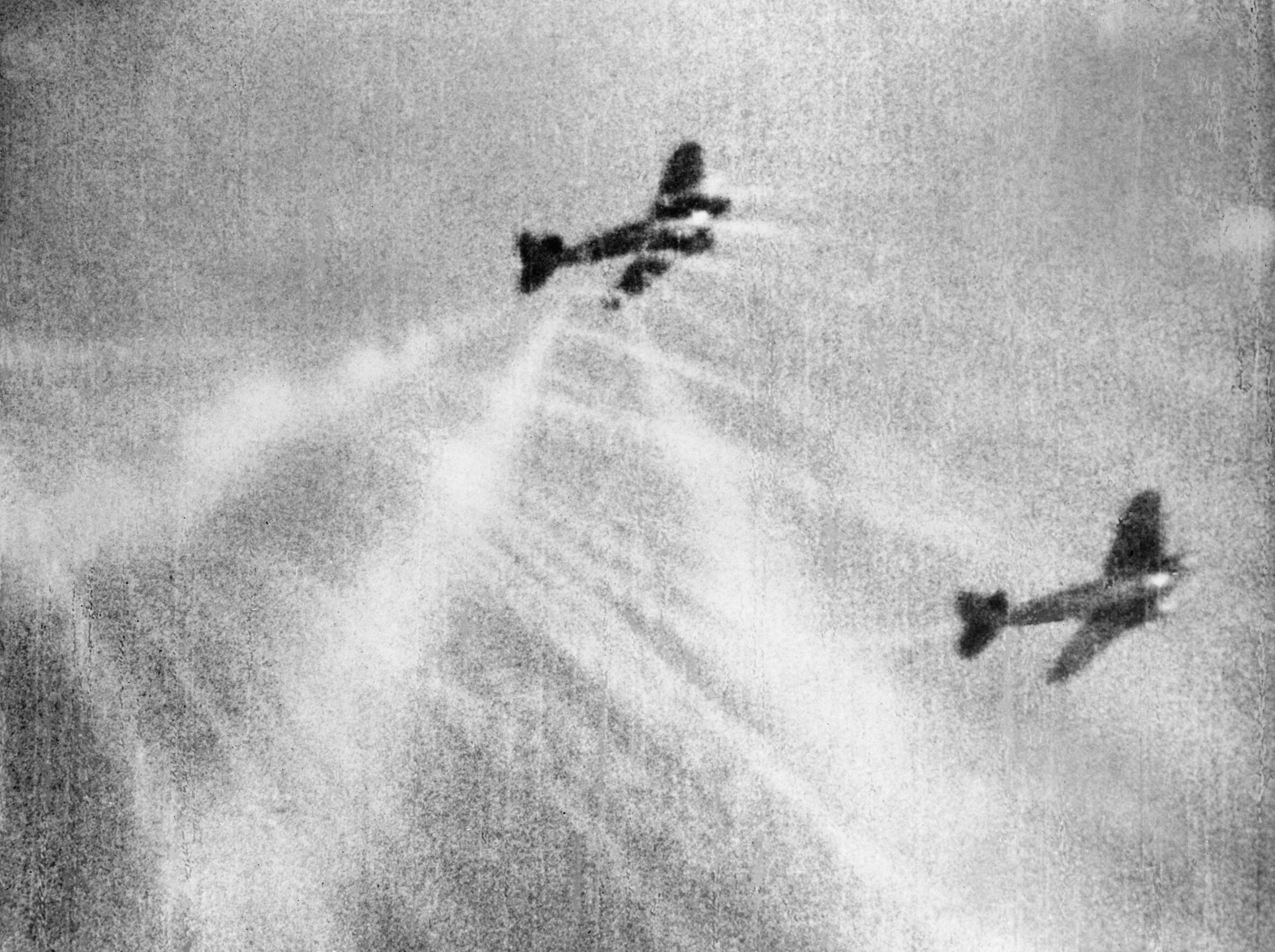
Gun camera film shows tracer ammunition from a Supermarine Spitfire Mark I of 609 Squadron hitting a Heinkel He 111 on its starboard quarter

Overall, by 2 November, the RAF fielded 1,796 pilots, an increase of over 40% from July 1940's count of 1,259 pilots. Based on German sources (from a Luftwaffe intelligence officer Otto Bechtle attached to KG 2 in February 1944) translated by the Air Historical Branch, Stephen Bungay asserts German fighter and bomber "strength" declined without recovery, and that from August–December 1940, the German fighter and bomber strength declined by 30 and 25 per cent. In contrast, Williamson Murray argues (using translations by the Air Historical Branch) that 1,380 German bombers were on strength on 29 June 1940, 1,420 bombers on 28 September, 1,423 level bombers on 2 November and 1,393 bombers on 30 November 1940. In July–September the number of Luftwaffe pilots available fell by 136, but the number of operational pilots had shrunk by 171 by September. The training organisation of the Luftwaffe was failing to replace losses. German fighter pilots, in contrast to popular perception, were not afforded training or rest rotations, unlike their British counterparts. The first week of September accounted for 25% of Fighter Command's and 24% of the Luftwaffe's overall losses. Between the dates 26 August – 6 September, on only one day (1 September) did the Germans destroy more aircraft than they lost. Losses were 325 German and 248 British.

Luftwaffe losses for August numbered 774 aircraft to all causes, representing 18.5% of all combat aircraft at the beginning of the month. Fighter Command's losses in August were 426 fighters destroyed, amounting to 40 per cent of 1,061 fighters available on 3 August. In addition, 99 German bombers and 27 other types were destroyed between 1 and 29 August.

From July to September, the Luftwaffe's loss records indicate the loss of 1,636 aircraft, 1,184 to enemy action. This represented 47% of the initial strength of single-engined fighters, 66% of twin-engined fighters, and 45% of bombers. This indicates the Germans were running out of aircrew as well as aircraft.

Throughout the battle, the Germans greatly underestimated the size of the RAF and the scale of British aircraft production. Across the Channel, the Air Intelligence division of the Air Ministry consistently overestimated the size of the German air enemy and the productive capacity of the German aviation industry. As the battle was fought, both sides exaggerated the losses inflicted on the other by an equally large margin. The intelligence picture formed before the battle encouraged the Luftwaffe to believe that such losses pushed Fighter Command to the very edge of defeat, while the exaggerated picture of German air strength persuaded the RAF that the threat it faced was larger and more dangerous than was the case. This led the British to the conclusion that another fortnight of attacks on airfields might force Fighter Command to withdraw their squadrons from the south of England. The German misconception, on the other hand, encouraged first complacency, then strategic misjudgement. The shift of targets from air bases to industry and communications was taken because it was assumed that Fighter Command was virtually eliminated.

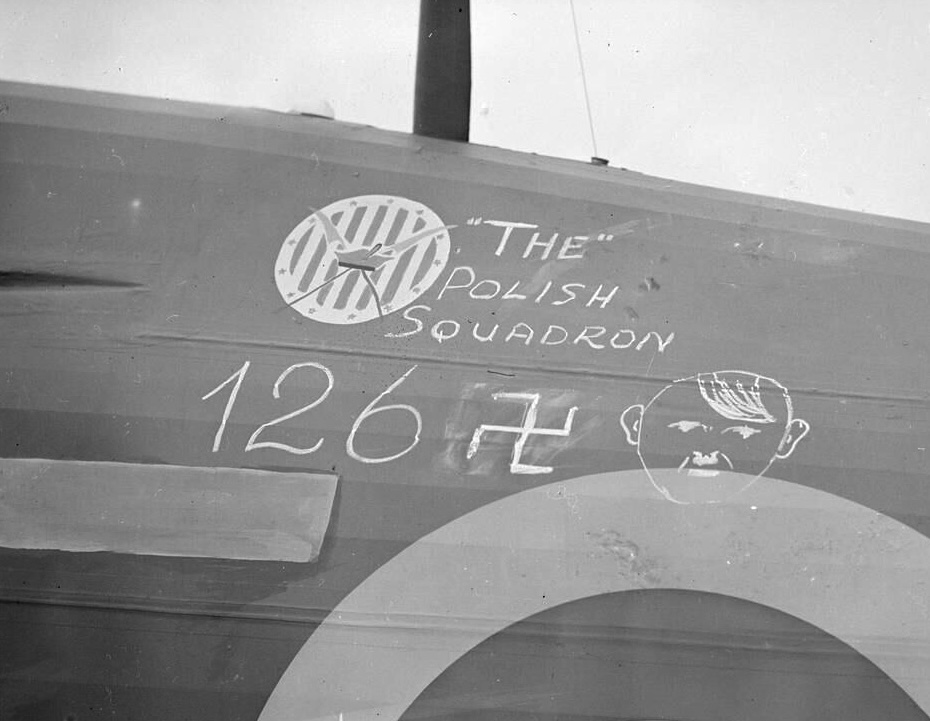
126 German aircraft or "Adolfs" were claimed by Polish pilots of 303 Squadron during the Battle of Britain.

Between 24 August and 4 September, German serviceability rates, which were acceptable at Stuka units, were running at 75% with Bf 109s, 70% with bombers and 65% with Bf 110s, indicating a shortage of spare parts. All units were well below established strength. The attrition was beginning to affect the fighters in particular. By 14 September, the Luftwaffe's Bf 109 Geschwader possessed only 67% of their operational crews against authorised aircraft. For Bf 110 units it was 46 per cent; and for bombers it was 59 per cent. A week later the figures had dropped to 64 per cent, 52% and 52 per cent. Serviceability rates in Fighter Command's fighter squadrons, between 24 August and 7 September, were listed as: 64.8% on 24 August; 64.7% on 31 August and 64.25% on 7 September 1940.

Due to the failure of the Luftwaffe to establish air supremacy, a conference assembled on 14 September at Hitler's headquarters. Hitler concluded that air superiority had not yet been established and "promised to review the situation on 17 September for possible landings on 27 September or 8 October. Three days later, when the evidence was clear that the German Air Force had greatly exaggerated the extent of their successes against the RAF, Hitler postponed Sea Lion indefinitely."

== Propaganda ==
Propaganda was an important element of the air war which began to develop over Britain from 18 June 1940 onwards, when the Luftwaffe began small, probing daylight raids to test RAF defences. One of many examples of these small-scale raids was the destruction of a school at Polruan in Cornwall, by a single raider. Into early July, the British media's focus on the air battles increased steadily, the press, magazines, BBC radio and newsreels daily conveying the contents of Air Ministry communiques. The German OKW communiques matched Britain's efforts in claiming the upper hand.

Central to the propaganda war on both sides of the Channel were aircraft claims, which are discussed under 'Attrition statistics' (above). These daily claims were important both for sustaining British home front morale and persuading America to support Britain, and were produced by the Air Ministry's Air Intelligence branch. Under pressure from American journalists and broadcasters to prove that the RAF's claims were genuine, RAF intelligence compared pilots' claims with actual aircraft wrecks and those seen to crash into the sea. It was soon realised that there was a discrepancy between the two, but the Air Ministry decided not to reveal this. In fact, it was not until May 1947 that the actual figures were released to the public, by which time it was no longer important. Many people refused to believe the revised figures, including Douglas Bader.

The place of the Battle of Britain in British popular memory partly stems from the Air Ministry's successful propaganda campaign from July to October 1940, and its praise of the defending fighter pilots from March 1941 onwards. The pamphlet The Battle of Britain sold in huge numbers internationally, leading even Goebbels to admire its propaganda value. Focusing only upon the fighter pilots, with no mention of RAF bomber attacks against invasion barges, the Battle of Britain was soon established as a major victory for Fighter Command. This inspired feature films, books, magazines, works of art, poetry, radio plays and MOI short films.

The Air Ministry also developed the Battle of Britain Sunday commemoration, supported a Battle of Britain clasp for issue to the pilots in 1945 and, from 1945, Battle of Britain Week. The Battle of Britain window in Westminster Abbey was also encouraged by the Air Ministry, with Trenchard and Dowding, now lords, on its committee. By July 1947 when the window was unveiled, the Battle of Britain had already attained central prominence as Fighter Command's most notable victory, the fighter pilots credited with preventing invasion in 1940. Although given widespread media coverage in September and October 1940, RAF Bomber and Coastal Command raids against invasion barge concentrations were less well-remembered.

== Aftermath ==
The Battle of Britain marked the first major defeat of Germany's military forces, with air superiority seen as the key to victory. Pre-war theories had led to exaggerated fears of strategic bombing, and UK public opinion was buoyed by coming through the ordeal. For the RAF, Fighter Command had achieved a great victory in successfully carrying out Sir Thomas Inskip's 1937 air policy of preventing the Germans from knocking Britain out of the war.

The battle also significantly shifted American opinion. During the battle, many Americans accepted the view promoted by Joseph Kennedy, the American ambassador in London, who believed that the United Kingdom could not survive. Roosevelt wanted a second opinion, and sent William "Wild Bill" Donovan on a brief visit to the UK; he became convinced the UK would survive and should be supported in every possible way. Before the end of the year, American journalist Ralph Ingersoll, after returning from Britain, published a book concluding that "Adolf Hitler met his first defeat in eight years" in what might "go down in history as a battle as important as Waterloo or Gettysburg". The turning point was when the Germans reduced the intensity of daylight attacks after 15 September. According to Ingersoll, "[a] majority of responsible British officers who fought through this battle believe that if Hitler and Göring had had the courage and the resources to lose 200 planes a day for the next five days, nothing could have saved London"; instead, "[the Luftwaffe's] morale in combat is definitely broken, and the RAF has been gaining in strength each week."

Both sides in the battle made exaggerated claims of numbers of enemy aircraft shot down. In general, claims were two to three times the actual numbers. Postwar analysis of records has shown that between July and September, the RAF claimed 2,698 kills, while the Luftwaffe fighters claimed 3,198 RAF aircraft shot down. Total losses, and start and end dates for recorded losses, vary for both sides. Luftwaffe losses from 10 July to 30 October 1940 total 1,977 aircraft, including 243 twin- and 569 single-engined fighters, 822 bombers and 343 non-combat types. In the same period, RAF Fighter Command aircraft losses number 1,087, including 53 twin-engined fighters. To the RAF figure should be added 376 Bomber Command and 148 Coastal Command aircraft lost conducting bombing, mining, and reconnaissance operations in defence of the country.

Stephen Bungay describes Dowding and Park's strategy of choosing when to engage the enemy whilst maintaining a coherent force as vindicated; their leadership, and the subsequent debates about strategy and tactics, had created enmity among RAF senior commanders and both were sacked from their posts in the immediate aftermath of the battle. All things considered, the RAF proved to be a robust and capable organisation that was to use all the modern resources available to it to the maximum advantage. Richard Evans writes:

Irrespective of whether Hitler was really set on this course, he simply lacked the resources to establish the air superiority that was the sine qua non [prerequisite] of a successful crossing of the English Channel. A third of the initial strength of the German air force, the Luftwaffe, had been lost in the western campaign in the spring. The Germans lacked the trained pilots, the effective fighter aircraft, and the heavy bombers that would have been needed. (Note: The exact percentage was 28. The Luftwaffe deployed 5,638 aircraft for the campaign. 1,428 were destroyed and a further 488 were damaged, but were repairable.)

The Germans launched some spectacular attacks against important British industries, but they could not destroy the British industrial potential, and made little systematic effort to do so. Hindsight does not disguise that the threat to Fighter Command was very real, and for the participants it seemed as if there was a narrow margin between victory and defeat. Nevertheless, even if the German attacks on the 11 Group airfields which guarded southeast England and the approaches to London had continued, the RAF could have withdrawn to the Midlands out of German fighter range and continued the battle from there. The victory was as much psychological as physical. Writes Alfred Price:

The truth of the matter, borne out by the events of 18 August, is more prosaic: neither by attacking the airfields nor by attacking London, was the Luftwaffe likely to destroy Fighter Command. Given the size of the British fighter force and the general high quality of its equipment, training and morale, the Luftwaffe could have achieved no more than a Pyrrhic victory. During the action on 18 August, it had cost the Luftwaffe five trained aircrew killed, wounded or taken prisoner, for each British fighter pilot killed or wounded; the ratio was similar on other days in the battle. And this ratio of 5:1 was very close to that between the number of German aircrew involved in the battle and those in Fighter Command. In other words, the two sides were suffering almost the same losses in trained aircrew, in proportion to their overall strengths. In the Battle of Britain, for the first time during the Second World War, the German war machine had set itself a major task which it patently failed to achieve, and so demonstrated that it was not invincible. In stiffening the resolve of those determined to resist Hitler the battle was an important turning point in the conflict.

Some historians are more cautious in assessing the significance of Germany's failure to knock Britain out of the war. Bungay writes, "Victory in the air achieved a modest strategic goal, for it did not bring Britain any closer to victory in the war, but merely avoided her defeat." Overy says, "The Battle of Britain did not seriously weaken Germany and her allies, nor did it much reduce the scale of the threat facing Britain (and the Commonwealth) in 1940/41 until German and Japanese aggression brought the Soviet Union and the United States into the conflict."

The British victory in the Battle of Britain was achieved at a heavy cost. Total British civilian losses from July to December 1940 were 23,002 dead and 32,138 wounded, with one of the largest single raids on 19 December 1940, in which almost 3,000 civilians died. With the culmination of the concentrated daylight raids, Britain was able to rebuild its military forces and establish itself as an Allied stronghold, later serving as a base from which the liberation of Western Europe was launched.

== Memorials and cultural impact ==
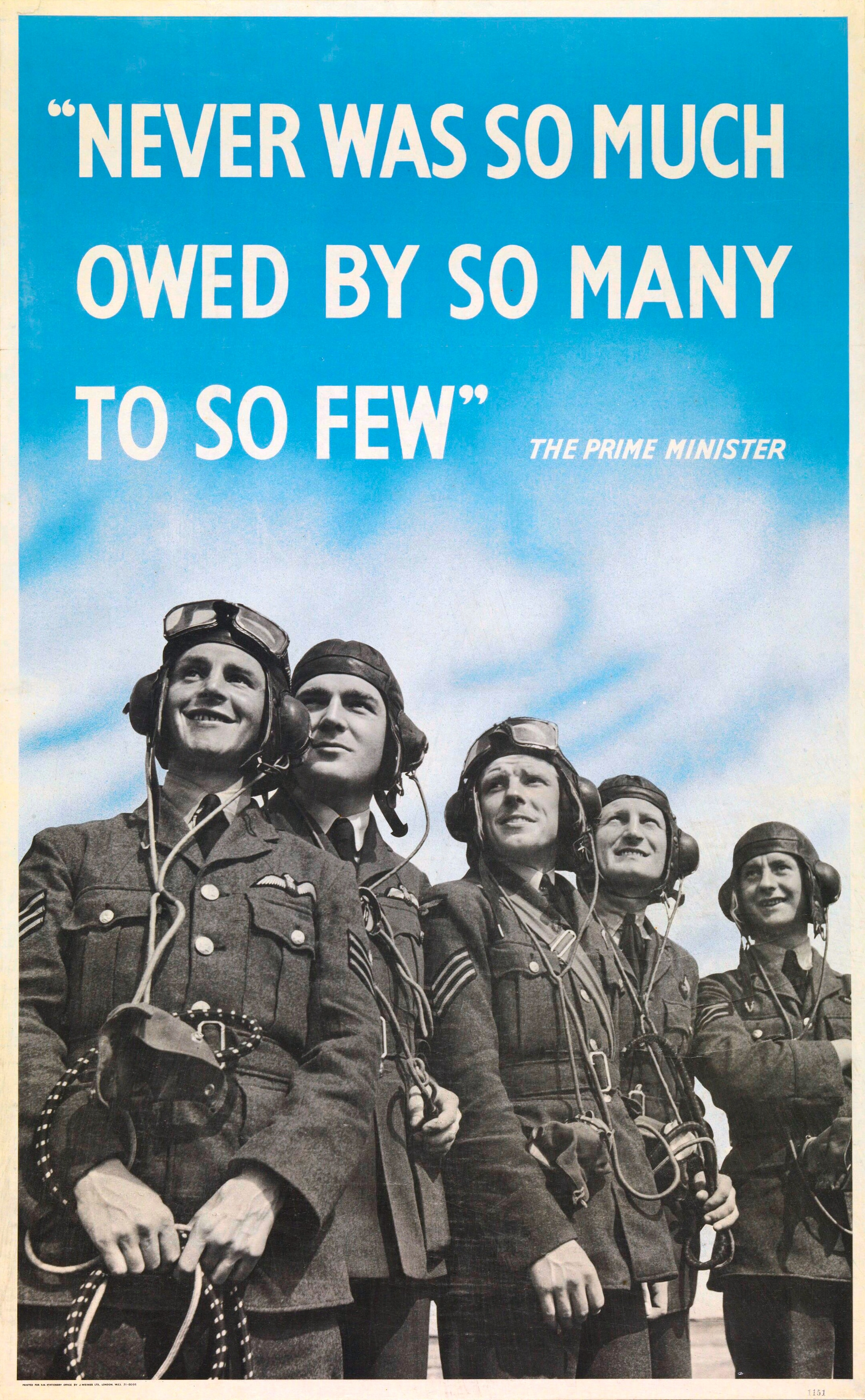
Second World War poster containing the famous lines by Winston Churchill

Winston Churchill summed up the battle with the words, "Never in the field of human conflict was so much owed by so many to so few". Pilots who fought in the battle have been known as The Few ever since, at times being specially commemorated on 15 September, "Battle of Britain Day". On this day in 1940, the Luftwaffe embarked on their largest bombing attack yet, forcing the engagement of the entirety of the RAF in defence of London and the South East, which resulted in a decisive British victory that proved to mark a turning point in Britain's favour. Within the Commonwealth, Battle of Britain Day has been observed more usually on the third Sunday in September, and even on the 2nd Thursday in September in some areas in the British Channel Islands.

Plans for the Battle of Britain window in Westminster Abbey were begun during wartime, the committee chaired by Lords Trenchard and Dowding. Public donations paid for the window itself, which replaced a window destroyed during the campaign, this officially opened by King George VI on 10 July 1947. Although not actually an 'official' memorial to the Battle of Britain in the sense that government paid for it, the window and chapel have since been viewed as such. During the late 1950s and 1960, various proposals were advanced for a national monument to the Battle of Britain, this also the focus of several letters in The Times. In 1960 the Conservative government decided against a further monument, taking the view that the credit should be shared more broadly than Fighter Command alone, and there was little public appetite for one. All subsequent memorials are the result of private subscription and initiative, as discussed below.

There are numerous memorials to the battle. The most important ones are the Battle of Britain Monument in London and the Battle of Britain Memorial at Capel-le-Ferne in Kent. As well as Westminster Abbey, St James's Church, Paddington also has a memorial window to the battle, replacing a window destroyed during it. There is also a memorial at the former Croydon Airport, one of the RAF bases during the battle, and a memorial to the pilots at Armadale Castle on the Isle of Skye in Scotland, which is topped by a raven sculpture. The Polish pilots who served in the battle are among the names on the Polish War Memorial in west London.

The Battle of Britain memorial in Central London was unveiled on 18 September 2005, the 65th anniversary of the battle, by Prince Charles and Camilla, Duchess of Cornwall, in the presence of many of the surviving airmen known collectively as "The Few". The monument was damaged on 10 October 2026, when protesters wearing keffiyehs and waving Palestinian flags marched and climbed onto it and trampled commemorative wreaths, including poppy wreaths laid at its base; the Metropolitan Police made several arrests on suspicion of criminal damage.

There are also three museums to the battle: one at Hawkinge in Kent Stanmore in London, at the former RAF Bentley Priory and one at Uxbridge at former RAF Uxbridge, now the Battle of Britain Bunker.

In 2015 the RAF created an online 'Battle of Britain 75th Anniversary Commemorative Mosaic' composed of pictures of "the few" – the pilots and aircrew who fought in the battle – and "the many" – 'the often unsung others whose contribution during the Battle of Britain was also vital to the RAF's victory in the skies above Britain', submitted by participants and their families.

Notable post-war memorials include:

- Battle of Britain Class steam locomotives of the Southern Railway
- Battle of Britain Memorial Flight
- Battle of Britain Memorial, Capel-le-Ferne
- Battle of Britain Monument, London
- Kent Battle of Britain Museum
- Polish War Memorial
- Spirit of the Few Monument

The battle was the subject of the film Battle of Britain (1969), starring Laurence Olivier as Hugh Dowding and Trevor Howard as Keith Park. It also starred Michael Caine, Christopher Plummer and Robert Shaw as squadron leaders. Former participants of the battle served as technical advisers, including Adolf Galland and Robert Stanford Tuck.

In the 2001 film Pearl Harbor, American participation in the Battle of Britain was exaggerated, as none of the "Eagle Squadrons" of American volunteers saw action in Europe before 1941.

As of 2003, a Hollywood film named The Few was in preparation for release in 2008, based on the story of real-life US pilot Billy Fiske, who ignored his country's neutrality rules and volunteered for the RAF. Bill Bond, who conceived the Battle of Britain Monument in London, described a Variety magazine outline of the film's historical content as "Totally wrong. The whole bloody lot."

The 1941 Allied propaganda film Churchill's Island was the winner of the first Academy Award for Documentary Short Subject.

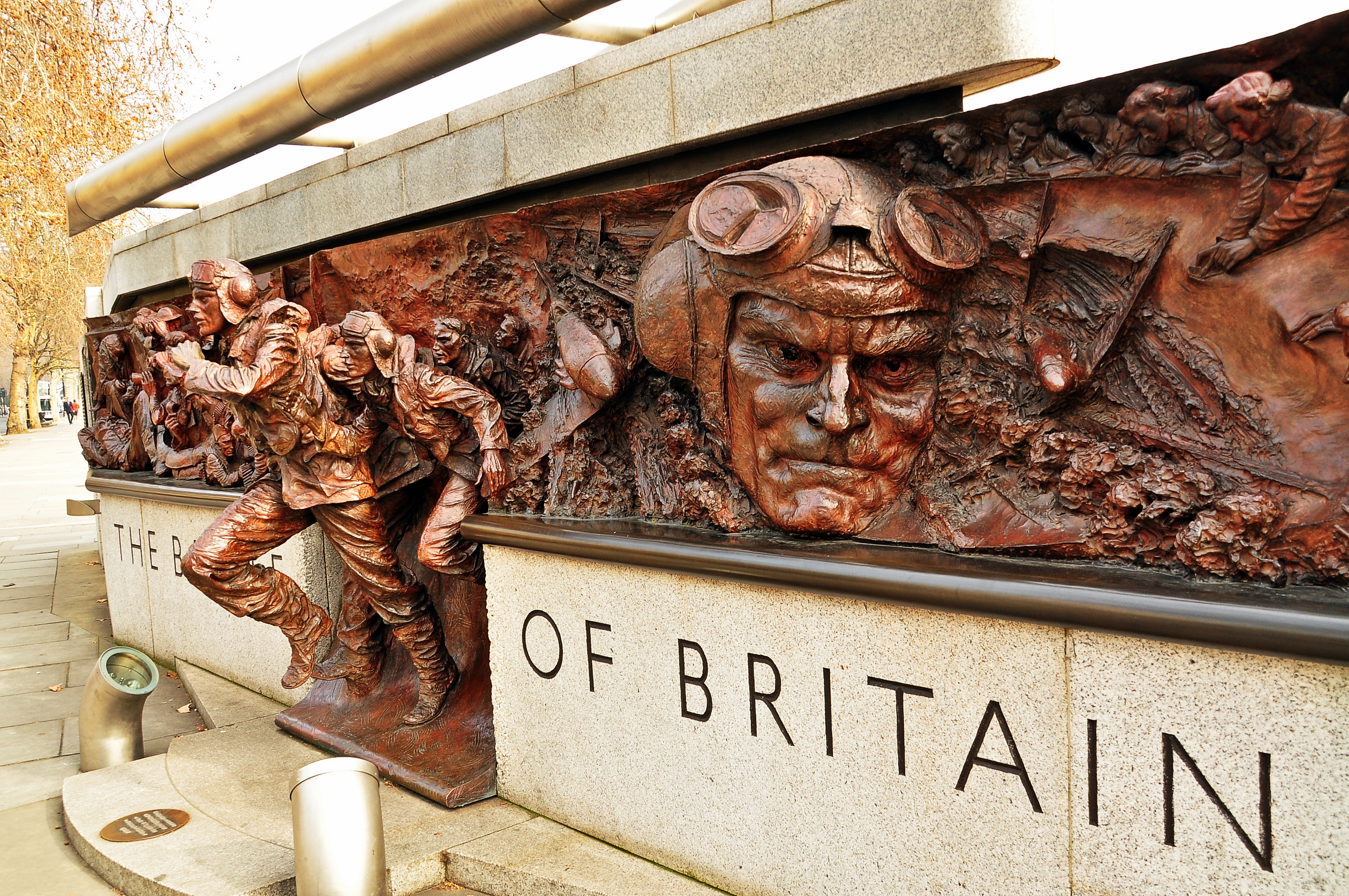
Victoria Embankment, London

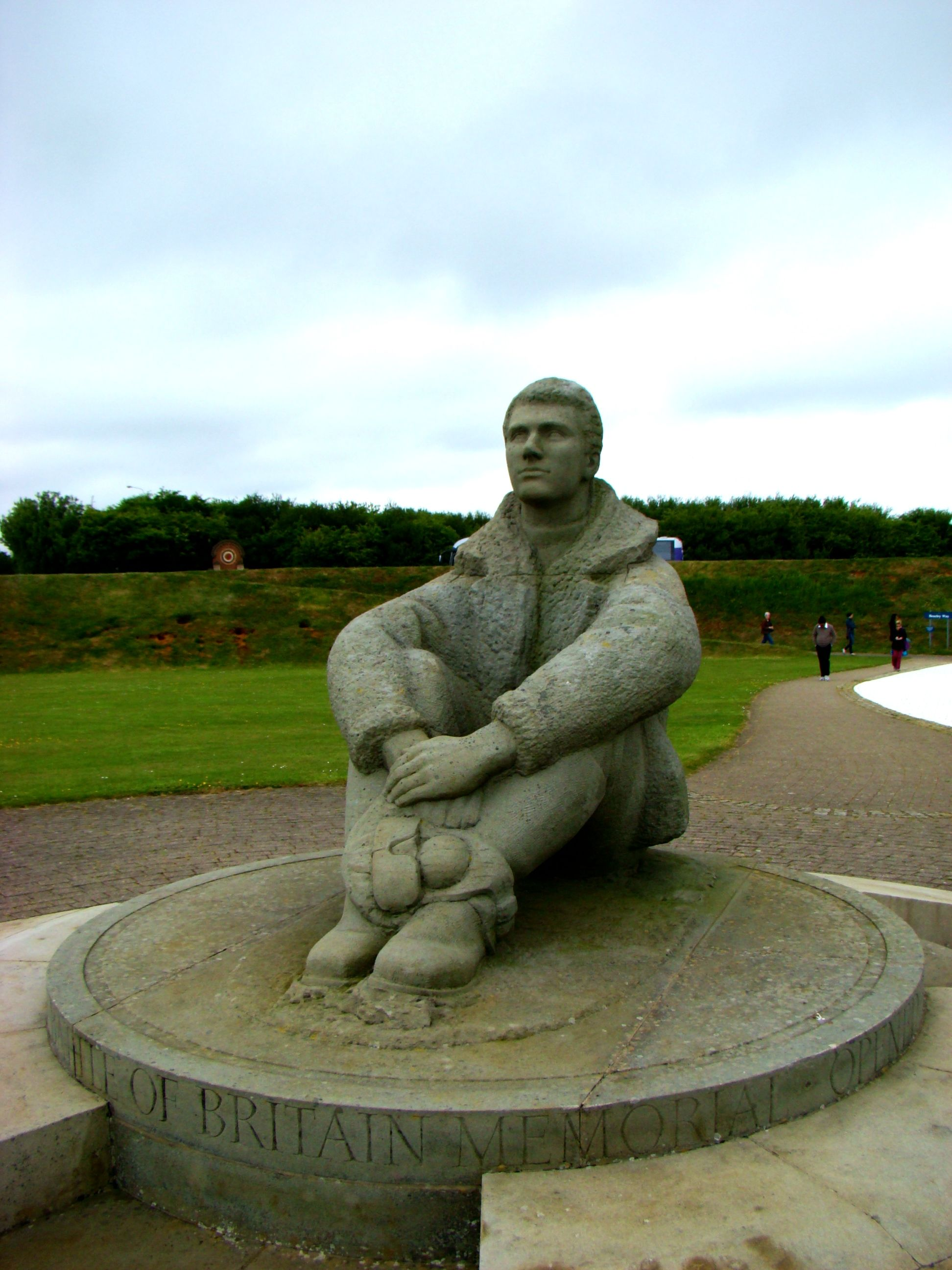
Capel-le-Ferne, Kent

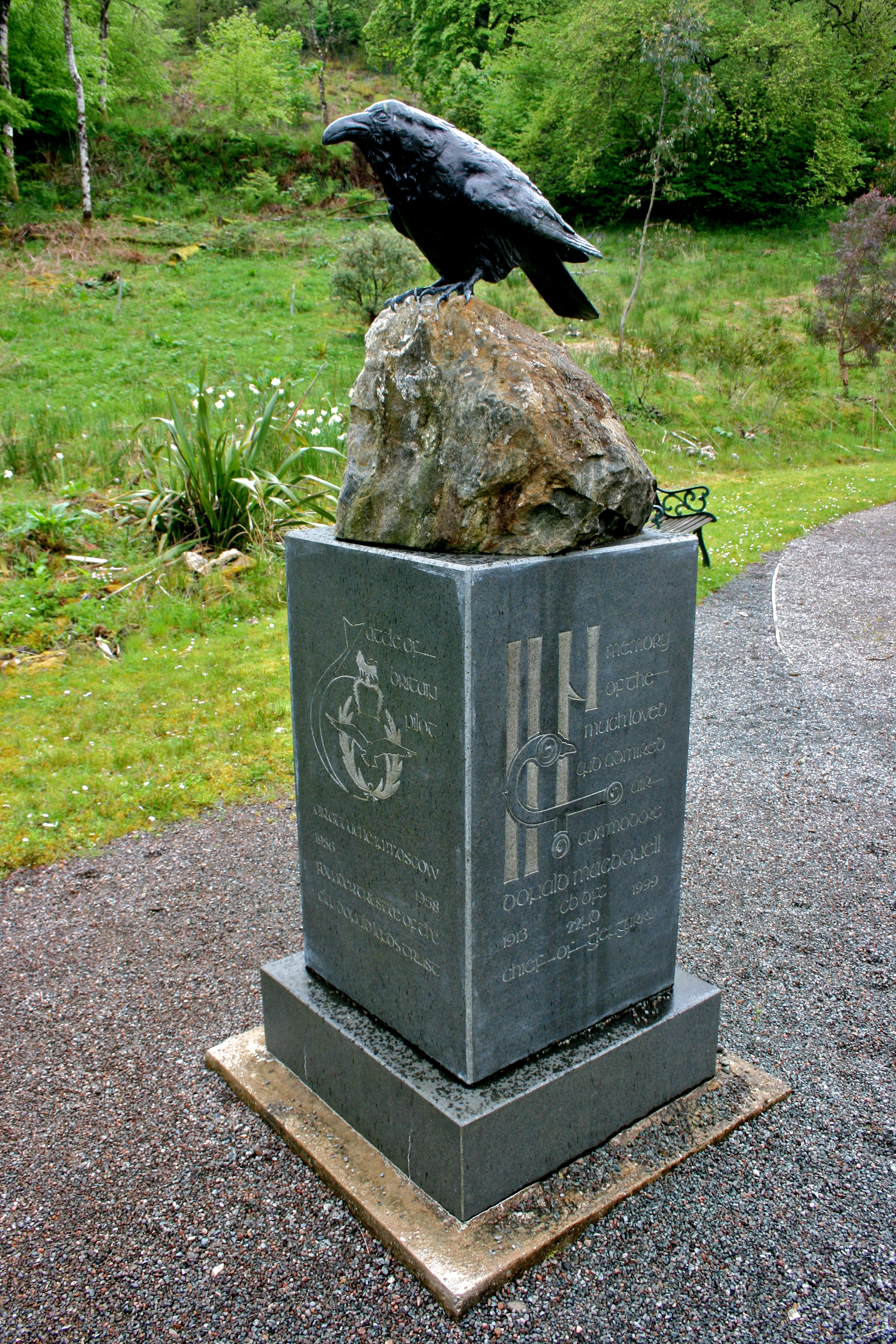
Armadale Castle

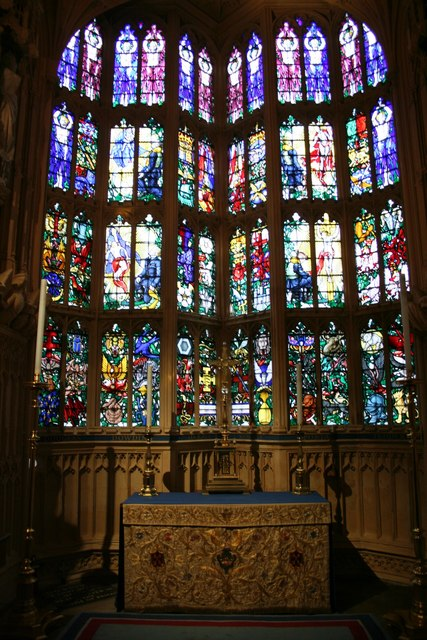
Westminster Abbey

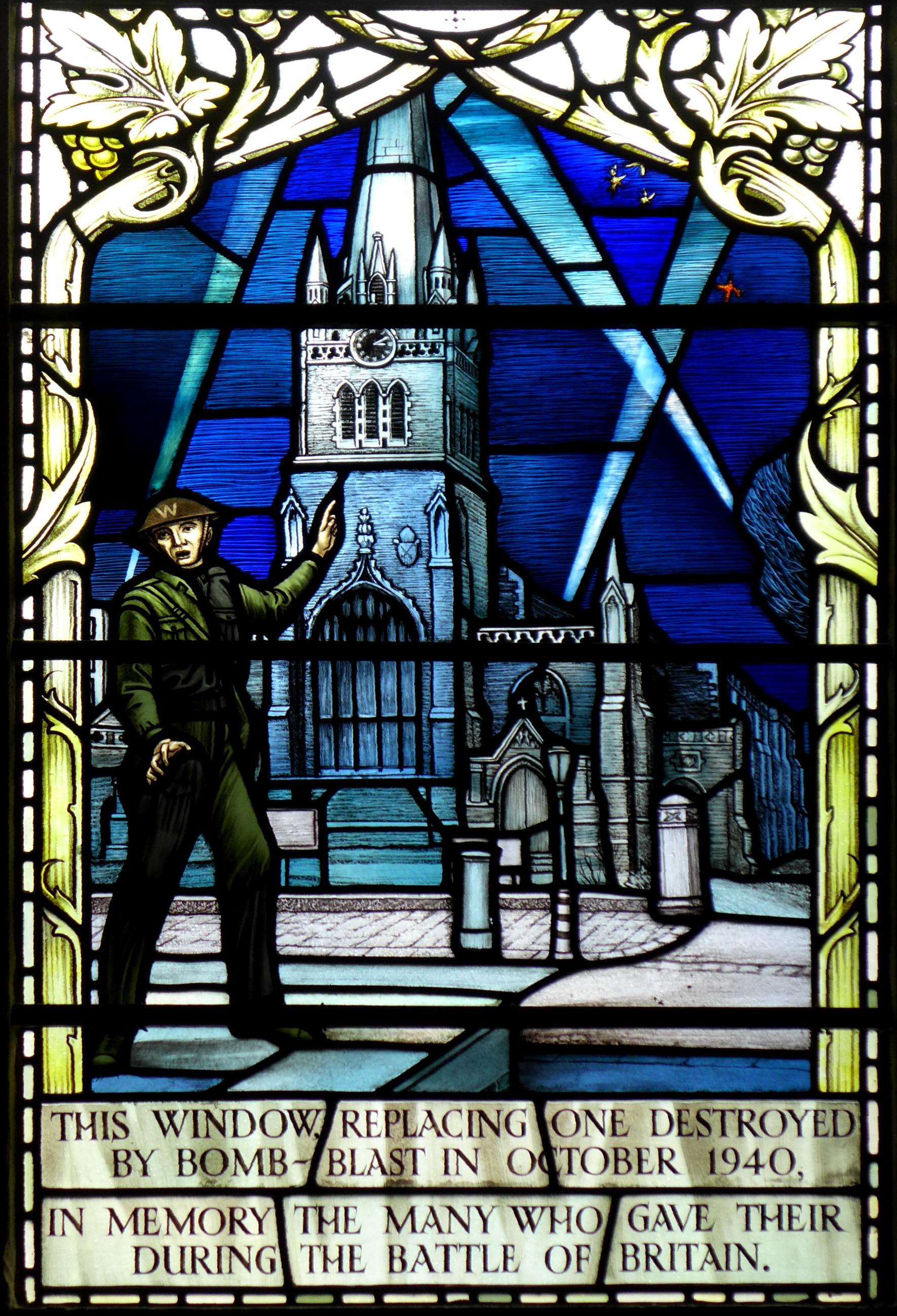
St James's Church, Paddington

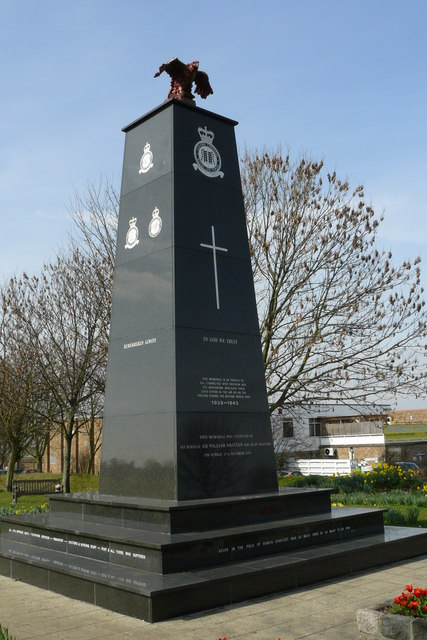
Croydon Airport

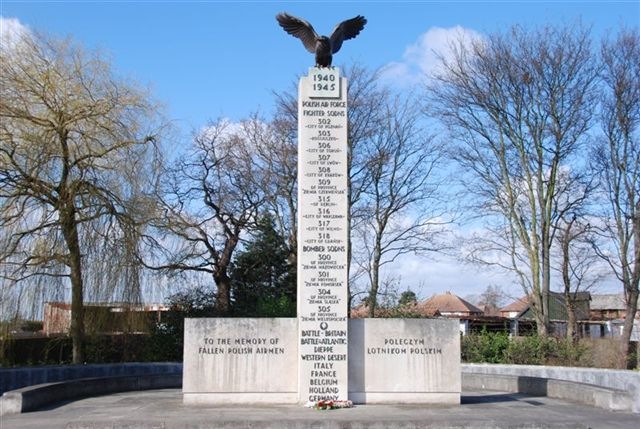
Monument of Polish Pilots, Northolt

== See also ==
- Bibliography of the Battle of Britain – List of English language works on the Battle of Britain
- British home front during World War II – Civilian population and activities of the United Kingdom during World War II
- Coventry Blitz – German bombing raids on the English city in World War II
- Evacuations of civilians in Britain during World War II – Movement of civilians away from aerial bombardment in British cities in the 1940s
- List of Battle of Britain airfields – Airfields used by the Royal Air Force in 1940
- List of Battle of Britain squadrons
- List of RAF aircrew in the Battle of Britain
- London in World War II – London between 1939 and 1945
- Military history of the United Kingdom during World War II
- Operation Banquet – Last resort British WW2 plan to throw every available aircraft into battle
- Operation Lucid – 1940 British anti-invasion fire ship plan
- Radio direction finding – Measurement of the direction from which a received signal was transmitted Essential for finding and directing planes.
- Battle of the Beams – Electronic warfare conflict in the Second World War
- The Darkest Hour – Phrase used to refer to World War II in 1940–1941

== Bibliography ==
=== General ===
- Allen, Hubert Raymond "Dizzy", Wing Commander RAF (1974). Who Won the Battle of Britain?. London: Arthur Barker. ISBN 978-0-213-16489-8..
- Bishop, Edward (1968). Their Finest Hour: The Story of the Battle of Britain, 1940. Ballantine] Books.
- Bishop, Patrick (2010). Battle of Britain : a day-by-day chronicle, 10 July 1940 to 31 October 1940. London: Quercus. ISBN 978-1-84916-224-1.
- Botquin, Gaston & Roba, Jean-Louis (September 1998). "La Luftwaffe dans la campagne à l'Ouest et la Bataille d'Angleterre" [The Luftwaffe in the Western Campaign of the Battle of Britain]. Avions: Toute l'aéronautique et son histoire (in French) (66): 15–22. ISSN 1243-8650.
- Buckley, John. Air Power in the Age of Total War. London: UCL Press, 1999. ISBN 1-85728-589-1.
- Buell, Thomas. The Second World War: Europe and the Mediterranean. New York: Square One Publishers, 2002. ISBN 978-0-7570-0160-4.
- Bungay, Stephen (2000). The Most Dangerous Enemy : A History of the Battle of Britain. London: Aurum Press. ISBN 978-1-85410-721-3. (hardcover), 2002, ISBN 1-85410-801-8 (paperback). ISBN 978-1-78131-495-1 (2015 paperback edition)
- Collier, Basil. The Defence of the United Kingdom (1962, Official history)
- Collier, Basil. The Battle of Britain (1962, Batsford's British Battles series)
- Collier, Richard. Eagle Day: The Battle of Britain, 6 August – 15 September 1940. London: Pan Books, 1968.
- Churchill, Winston S (1949), The Second World War – Their Finest Hour (Volume 2), London: Cassell
- Churchill, Winston S. The Second World War – The Grand Alliance (Volume 3). Bantam Books, 1962.
- Crosby, Francis (2002). A Handbook of Fighter Aircraft: Featuring Photographs from the Imperial War Museum. Hermes House. ISBN 978-0681342569.
- Deighton, Len (1996). Fighter: The True Story of the Battle of Britain. London: Pimlico. ISBN 978-0-7126-7423-2. (Originally published: London: Jonathan Cape, 1977.) ISBN 0-7126-7423-3.
- Deighton, Len; Hastings, Max (1980). Battle of Britain. Diane Publishing Company. ISBN 978-0756750770.
- Dye, Air Commodore Peter J. (Winter 2000), "Logistics and the Battle of Britain", Air Force Journal of Logistics, vol. 24, no. 4, archived from the original on 26 September 2010
- Ellis, John. Brute Force: Allied Strategy and Tactics in the Second World War. London: Andre Deutsch, 1990. ISBN 0-8264-8031-4.
- Evans, Michael. "Never in the field of human conflict was so much owed by so many to ... the Navy." The Times, 24 August 2006. Retrieved: 3 March 2007.
- Goodenough, Simon. War Maps: World War II, From September 1939 to August 1945, Air, Sea, and Land, Battle by Battle. New York: St. Martin's Press, 1982, ISBN 978-0-3128-5584-0.
- Halpenny, Bruce Barrymore (1984). Action Station 4: Military Airfields of Yorkshire. Cambridge, UK: Patrick Stevens. ISBN 978-0-85059-532-1.
- Harding, Thomas. "Battle of Britain was won at sea." The Telegraph, 25 August 2006. Retrieved: 25 August 2006.
- Holland, James (2011). The Battle of Britain. Transworld. ISBN 978-1-4070-6652-3.
- Hough, Richard; Richards, Denis (2007), The Battle of Britain: The Greatest Air Battle of World War II, New York: W.W. Norton & Co Inc, ISBN 978-0-393-02766-2
- Ingersoll, Ralph (1940), Report on England, November 1940, New York: Simon & Schuster
- Keegan, John. The Second World War London: Pimlico, 1997. ISBN 978-0-7126-7348-8.
- Korda, Michael (2010), With Wings Like Eagles: The Untold Story of the Battle of Britain, New York: Harper Perennial, ISBN 978-0-06-112536-2
- Manchester, William; Reid, Paul (2012). The Last Lion: Winston Spencer Churchill: Defender of the Realm, 1940–1965. Pan Macmillan. ISBN 978-1-4472-7954-9.
- Overy, R. J. (1980). The Air War, 1939–1945. Scarborough House. ISBN 978-0812861563.
- Overy, Richard J. (2001). The Battle of Britain: The Myth and the Reality. New York: W.W. Norton. ISBN 978-0-393-02008-3. (hardcover, ISBN 0-393-32297-1 paperback, 2002)
- Overy, Richard J. (2013). The Bombing War : Europe 1939–1945. London & New York: Allen Lane. ISBN 978-0-7139-9561-9.
- Owen, R.E, New Zealanders with the Royal Air Force Government Printer, Wellington, New Zealand 1953.
- Pearson, Simon; Gorman, Ed (2020). Battle of Britain: The Pilots and Planes That Made History. London, United Kingdom: Hodder & Stoughton. ISBN 978-1-529-37807-8.
- Peszke, Michael Alfred (October 1980), "A Synopsis of Polish-Allied Military Agreements During World War Two", The Journal of Military History, 44 (3): 128–134
- Ponting, Clive (1991). 1940: Myth and Reality. I.R. Dee. ISBN 978-0929587684.
- Pope, Stephan. "Across the Ether: Part One". Aeroplane, Vol. 23, No. 5, Issue No. 265, May 1995.
- Price, Alfred (1980), The Hardest Day: 18 August 1940, New York: Charles Scribner's Sons, ISBN 978-0-684-16503-5
- Ramsay, Winston, ed. (1987), The Blitz Then and Now: Volume 1, London: Battle of Britain Prints International, ISBN 978-0-900913-45-7
- Ramsay, Winston, ed. (1988), The Blitz Then and Now: Volume 2, London: Battle of Britain Prints International, ISBN 978-0-900913-54-9
- Ramsay, Winston, ed. (1989), The Battle of Britain Then and Now Mk V, London: Battle of Britain Prints International, ISBN 978-0-900913-46-4
- Richards, Denis (1953). Royal Air Force 1939–1945. Vol. 1: The Fight at Odds 1939–1941. H.M. Stationery Office.
- Robinson, Derek, Invasion, 1940: Did the Battle of Britain Alone Stop Hitler? New York: Carroll & Graf, 2005. ISBN 0-7867-1618-5.
- Shulman, Milton. Defeat in the West. London: Cassell, 2004 (First edition 1947). ISBN 0-304-36603-X.
- Stacey, C P (1955). The Canadian Army 1939–1945 An Official Historical Summary. Ottawa: Queen's Printer.
- Stacey, C P. (1970) Arms, Men and Governments: The War Policies of Canada, 1939–1945 Queen's Printer, Ottawa (Downloadable PDF)
- Taylor, A. J. P.; Mayer, S. L., eds. (1974). A History of World War Two. London: Octopus Books. ISBN 978-0-7064-0399-2.
- Terraine, John (1985). The Right of the Line: The Royal Air Force in the European War, 1939-45. Hodder & Stroughton. ISBN 978-0340266441.
- Terraine, John, A Time for Courage: The Royal Air Force in the European War, 1939–1945. London: Macmillan, 1985. ISBN 978-0-02-616970-7.
- Winterbotham, F. W. (1975), The Ultra Secret, London: Futura Publications, ISBN 978-0-86007-268-3
- Wood, Derek; Dempster, Derek (2003). The Narrow Margin. Pen and Sword. ISBN 978-1-84884-314-1.
- Wright, Gordon (1968). The ordeal of total war, 1939–1945. Harper & Row. ISBN 978-0061314087.

=== Luftwaffe ===
- Archambault, Claude (December 2000). "Affrontements meurtriers dans le ciel français, vus en 1940/41 par la 209.I.D." [Deadly Clashs in French Skies, Seen by the 208th Infantry Division]. Avions: Toute l'Aéronautique et son histoire (in French) (93): 9–16. ISSN 1243-8650.
- Archambault, Claude (January 2001). "Affrontements meurtriers dans le ciel français, vus en 1940/41 par la 209.I.D.". Avions: Toute l'Aéronautique et son histoire (in French) (94): 23–30. ISSN 1243-8650.
- Archambault, Claude (January 2000). "La Bataille d'Angleterre vue par la 227.I.D." [The Battle of Britain Viewed by the 227th Infantry Division]. Avions: Toute l'Aéronautique et Son Histoire (in French) (82): 13–17. ISSN 1243-8650.
- Corum, James. The Luftwaffe: Creating the Operational Air War, 1918–1940. Lawrence, Kansas: Kansas University Press, 1997. ISBN 0-7006-0836-2.
- de Zeng, Henry L., Doug G. Stankey and Eddie J. Creek. Bomber Units of the Luftwaffe 1933–1945: A Reference Source, Volume 1. Hersham, Surrey, UK: Ian Allan Publishing, 2007. ISBN 978-1-85780-279-5.
- Dildy, Douglas C. "The Air Battle for England: The Truth Behind the Failure of the Luftwaffe's Counter-Air Campaign in 1940." Air Power History 63.2 (2016): 27.
- Dönitz, Karl. Ten years and Twenty Days. New York: Da Capo Press, First Edition, 1997. ISBN 0-306-80764-5.
- Hooton, E.R. (2007). Luftwaffe at War: Blitzkrieg in the West, Vol. 2. London: Chevron/Ian Allan. ISBN 978-1-85780-272-6..
- Irving, David (1974), The Rise and Fall of the Luftwaffe: The Life of Field Marshal Erhard Milch, Dorney, Windsor, UK: Focal Point Publications, ISBN 978-0-297-76532-5
- Kieser, Egbert. Operation Sea Lion; The German Plan to Invade Britain 1940. London: Cassel Military Paperbacks, 1999. ISBN 0-304-35208-X.
- Macksey, Kenneth. Invasion: The German Invasion of England, July 1940. London: Greenhill Books, 1990. ISBN 0-85368-324-7.
- Magenheimer, Heinz (10 September 2015). Hitler's War: Germany's Key Strategic Decisions 1940–45. Orion. ISBN 978-1-4746-0275-4.
- Mason, Francis K. Battle Over Britain: A History of the German Air Assaults on Great Britain, 1917–18 and July–December 1940, and the Development of Air Defences Between the World Wars. New York: Doubleday, 1969. ISBN 978-0-901928-00-9.
- Murray, Williamson (2002). Strategy for defeat : the Luftwaffe, 1933–1945. Honolulu, Hawaii: University Press of the Pacific. ISBN 978-0-89875-797-2.
- Prien, Jochen; Stemmer, Gerhard; Rodeike, Peter; Bock, Winfried (2002). Die Jagdfliegerverbände der Deutschen Luftwaffe 1934 bis 1945—Teil 4/I—Einsatz am Kanal und über England—26.6.1940 bis 21.6.1941 [The Fighter Units of the German Air Force 1934 to 1945—Part 4/I—Action at the Channel and over England—26 June 1940 to 21 June 1941] (in German). Eutin, Germany: Struve-Druck. ISBN 978-3-923457-63-2.
- Raeder, Erich. Erich Rader, Grand Admiral. New York: Da Capo Press; United States Naval Institute, 2001. ISBN 0-306-80962-1.
- Shirer, William (1990) [1964], The Rise and Fall of the Third Reich: A History of Nazi Germany, London: Ballantine, ISBN 978-0-449-21977-5
- Smith, Howard Kingsbury (1942). Last Train from Berlin. A. A. Knopf.
- Stedman, Robert F. (2012). Jagdflieger: Luftwaffe Fighter Pilot 1939–45. Bloomsbury Publishing. ISBN 978-1780969831.
- Wagner, Ray; Nowarra, Heinz (1971). German Combat Planes: A Comprehensive Survey and History of the Development of German Military Aircraft from 1914 to 194. New York: Doubleday & Company.
- Watteau, Pierre (June 2000). "Courrier des Lecteurs" [Readers' Letters]. Avions: Toute l'Aéronautique et son histoire (in French) (87): 3. ISSN 1243-8650.

=== Autobiographies and biographies ===
- Brew, Steve. A Ruddy Awful Waste: Eric Lock DSO, DFC & Bar; The Brief Life of a Battle of Britain Fighter Ace. London: Fighting High, 2016.
- Collier, Basil. Leader of the Few: the Authorised Biography of Air Chief Marshal Lord Dowding of Bentley Priory. London: Jarrolds, 1957.
- Deere, Alan Christopher (1974), Nine Lives, London: Hodder Paperbacks Ltd for Coronet Books, ISBN 978-0-340-01441-7
- Duncan Smith, W. G. G. (2002). Spitfire into Battle. Hodder & Stoughton. ISBN 978-0719554841.
- Franks, Norman, Wings of Freedom: Twelve Battle of Britain Pilots. London: William Kimber, 1980. ISBN 0-7183-0197-8.
- Galland, Adolf (2005). The First and the Last: Germany's Fighter Force in the Second World War. Cerberus. ISBN 978-1841450209.
- Halpenny, Bruce, Fight for the Sky: Stories of Wartime Fighter Pilots. Cambridge, UK: Patrick Stephens, 1986. ISBN 0-85059-749-8.
- Halpenny, Bruce, Fighter Pilots in World War II: True Stories of Frontline Air Combat (paperback). Barnsley, UK: Pen and Sword Books Ltd, 2004. ISBN 1-84415-065-8.
- Orange, Vincent (2001). Park: The Biography of Air Chief Marshal Sir Keith Park, GCB, KBE, MC, DFC, DCL. Grub Street Publishers. ISBN 978-1-909166-72-1.

=== Aircraft ===
- Ansell, Mark (2005). Boulton Paul Defiant: Technical Details and History of the Famous British Night Fighter. Redbourn, Herts, UK: Mushroom Model Publications. pp. 712–714. ISBN 978-83-89450-19-7..
- de Zeng, Henry L., Doug G. Stankey and Eddie J. Creek, Bomber Units of the Luftwaffe 1933–1945: A Reference Source, Volume 2. Hersham, Surrey, UK: Ian Allan Publishing, 2007. ISBN 978-1-903223-87-1.
- Feist, Uwe (1993). The Fighting Me 109. London: Arms and Armour Press. ISBN 978-1-85409-209-0..
- Goss, Chris, Dornier 17: In Focus. Surrey, UK: Red Kite Books, 2005. ISBN 0-9546201-4-3.
- Green, William (1962). Famous Fighters of the Second World War. London: Macdonald and Jane's Publishers Ltd.
- Green, William (1980) [First edition, 1970]. Warplanes of the Third Reich. London: Macdonald and Jane's Publishers Ltd. ISBN 978-0-356-02382-3.
- Harvey-Bailey, Alec (1995). Merlin in Perspective: The Combat Years. Derby, UK: Rolls-Royce Heritage Trust. ISBN 978-1-8729-2206-5..
- Holmes, Tony (1998). Hurricane Aces 1939–1940 (Aircraft of the Aces). Botley, Oxford, UK: Osprey Publishing. ISBN 978-1-85532-597-5.
- Holmes, Tony (2007), Spitfire vs Bf 109: Battle of Britain, Oxford: Osprey, ISBN 978-1-84603-190-8
- Huntley, Ian D., Fairey Battle, Aviation Guide 1. Bedford, UK: SAM Publications, 2004. ISBN 0-9533465-9-5.
- Jones, Robert C. (1970). Camouflage and Markings Number 8: Boulton Paul Defiant, RAF Northern Europe 1936–45. London: Ducimus Book Limited.
- Lloyd, Sir Ian; Pugh, Peter (2004). Hives and the Merlin. Cambridge: Icon Books. ISBN 978-1840466447.
- Mason, Francis K., Hawker Aircraft since 1920. London: Putnam, 1991. ISBN 0-85177-839-9.
- McKinstry, Leo (2010). Hurricane: Victor of the Battle of Britain. Hodder & Stoughton. ISBN 978-1848543942.
- Molson, Kenneth M. et al., Canada's National Aviation Museum: Its History and Collections. Ottawa: National Aviation Museum, 1988. ISBN 978-0-660-12001-0.
- Moyes, Philip, J. R., "The Fairey Battle." Aircraft in Profile, Volume 2 (nos. 25–48). Windsor, Berkshire, UK: Profile Publications, 1971. ISBN 0-85383-011-8
- Parry, Simon W., Intruders over Britain: The Story of the Luftwaffe's Night Intruder Force, the Fernnachtjager. Washington, DC: Smithsonian Books, 1989. ISBN 0-904811-07-7.
- Price, Alfred (1996), Spitfire Mark I/II Aces 1939–41 (Aircraft of the Aces 12), London: Osprey Books, ISBN 978-1-85532-627-9
- Price, Alfred (2002), The Spitfire Story: Revised second edition, Enderby, Leicester, UK: Silverdale Books, ISBN 978-1-85605-702-8
- Sarkar, Dilip (2011). How the Spitfire Won the Battle of Britain. Amberley Publishing Limited. ISBN 978-1-4456-0981-2.
- Scutts, Jerry, Messerschmitt Bf 109: The Operational Record. Sarasota, Florida: Crestline Publishers, 1996. ISBN 978-0-7603-0262-0.
- Ward, John (2004). Hitler's Stuka Squadrons: The JU 87 at War 1936–1945. MBI Publishing Company LLC. ISBN 978-0760319918.
- Warner, G (2005), The Bristol Blenheim: A Complete History (2nd ed.), London: Crécy Publishing, ISBN 978-0-85979-101-4
- Weal, John (1999), Messerschmitt Bf 110 'Zerstōrer' Aces of World War 2, Botley, Oxford, UK: Osprey Publishing, ISBN 978-1-85532-753-5

=== Additional references ===
- Addison, Paul and Jeremy Crang. The Burning Blue: A New History of the Battle of Britain. London: Pimlico, 2000. ISBN 0-7126-6475-0.
- Bergström, Christer. Barbarossa – The Air Battle: July–December 1941. London: Chevron/Ian Allan, 2007. ISBN 978-1-85780-270-2.
- Bergström, Christer. The Battle of Britain – An Epic Battle Revisited. Eskilstuna: Vaktel Books/Casemate, 2010. ISBN 978-1612003474.
- Bishop, Patrick. Fighter Boys: The Battle of Britain, 1940. New York: Viking, 2003 (hardcover, ISBN 0-670-03230-1); Penguin Books, 2004. ISBN 0-14-200466-9. As Fighter Boys: Saving Britain 1940. London: Harper Perennial, 2004. ISBN 0-00-653204-7.
- Brittain, Vera. England's Hour. London: Continuum International Publishing Group, 2005 (paperback, ISBN 0-8264-8031-4); Obscure Press (paperback, ISBN 1-84664-834-3).
- Campion, Garry (2008), The Good Fight: Battle of Britain Wartime Propaganda and The Few (First ed.), Basingstoke, Hampshire, UK: Palgrave Macmillan, ISBN 978-0-230-27996-4.
- Campion, Garry (2015), The Battle of Britain, 1945–1965: The Air Ministry and the Few, Palgrave Macmillan, ISBN 978-0230284548
- Cooper, Matthew. The German Air Force 1933–1945: An Anatomy of Failure. New York: Jane's Publishing Incorporated, 1981. ISBN 0-531-03733-9.
- Craig, Phil and Tim Clayton. Finest Hour: The Battle of Britain. New York: Simon & Schuster, 2000. ISBN 0-684-86930-6 (hardcover); 2006, ISBN 0-684-86931-4 (paperback).
- Cumming, Anthony J. The Royal Navy and The Battle of Britain. Annapolis, Maryland: Naval Institute Press, 2010. ISBN 978-1-59114-160-0.
- Fiedler, Arkady. 303 Squadron: The Legendary Battle of Britain Fighter Squadron. Los Angeles: Aquila Polonica, 2010. ISBN 978-1-60772-004-1.
- Fisher, David E. A Summer Bright and Terrible: Winston Churchill, Lord Dowding, Radar and the Impossible Triumph of the Battle of Britain. Emeryville, CA: Shoemaker & Hoard, 2005. (hardcover, ISBN 1-59376-047-7); 2006, ISBN 1-59376-116-3 (paperback).
- Foreman, John (1988), Battle of Britain: The Forgotten Months, November And December 1940, New Malden: Air Research Publications, ISBN 1-871187-02-8
- Gaskin, Margaret. Blitz: The Story of 29 December 1940. New York: Harcourt, 2006. ISBN 0-15-101404-3.
- Gretzyngier, Robert; Matusiak, Wojtek (1998). Polish Aces of World War 2. London: Osprey. ISBN 978-1-85532-726-9..
- Haining, Peter (2005). The Chianti Raiders: The Extraordinary Story of the Italian Air Force in the Battle of Britain. Pavilion Books. ISBN 978-1-86105-829-4.
- Haining, Peter. Where the Eagle Landed: The Mystery of the German Invasion of Britain, 1940. London: Robson Books, 2004. ISBN 1-86105-750-4.
- Halpenny, Bruce Barrymore. Action Stations: Military Airfields of Greater London v. 8. Cambridge, UK: Patrick Stephens, 1984. ISBN 0-85039-885-1.
- Harding, Thomas. "It's baloney, say RAF aces". The Telegraph, 24 August 2006. Retrieved: 3 March 2007.
- Hough, Richard. The Battle of Britain: The Greatest Air Battle of World War II. New York: W.W. Norton, 1989. ISBN 0-393-02766-X (hardcover); 2005, ISBN 0-393-30734-4(paperback).
- James, T.C.G. The Battle of Britain (Air Defence of Great Britain; vol. 2). London/New York: Frank Cass Publishers, 2000. ISBN 0-7146-5123-0(hardcover); ISBN 0-7146-8149-0 (paperback, ).
- James, T.C.G. Growth of Fighter Command, 1936–1940 (Air Defence of Great Britain; vol. 1). London; New York: Frank Cass Publishers, 2000. ISBN 0-7146-5118-4.
- James, T.C.G. Night Air Defence During the Blitz. London/New York: Frank Cass Publishers, 2003. ISBN 0-7146-5166-4.
- McGlashan, Kenneth B. with Owen P. Zupp. Down to Earth: A Fighter Pilot Recounts His Experiences of Dunkirk, the Battle of Britain, Dieppe, D-Day and Beyond. London: Grub Street Publishing, 2007. ISBN 1-904943-84-5.
- March, Edgar J. British Destroyers; a History of Development 1892–1953. London: Seely Service & Co. Limited, 1966.
- Olson, Lynne; Cloud, Stanley (2003). A Question of Honor: The Kościuszko Squadron: Forgotten Heroes of World War II. New York: Knopf. ISBN 978-0-375-41197-7.. NB: This book is also published under the following title:
  - For Your Freedom and Ours: The Kościuszko Squadron – Forgotten Heroes of World War II.
- Mason, Francis K. "Battle over Britain". McWhirter Twins Ltd. 1969 {A day by day accounting of RaF and Luftwaffe losses}
- Prien, Jochen and Peter Rodeike.Messerschmitt Bf 109 F, G, and K: An Illustrated Study. Atglen, Pennsylvania: Schiffer Publishing, 1995. ISBN 0-88740-424-3.
- Ray, John Philip (2003). The Battle of Britain: Dowding and the First Victory, 1940. Cassell. ISBN 978-0304356775.
- Ray, John Philip. The Battle of Britain: New Perspectives: Behind the Scenes of the Great Air War. London: Arms & Armour Press, 1994 (hardcover, ISBN 1-85409-229-4); London: Orion Publishing, 1996 (paperback, ISBN 1-85409-345-2).
- Rongers, Eppo H. De oorlog in mei '40, Utrecht/Antwerpen: Uitgeverij Het Spectrum N.V., 1969, No ISBN
- Townsend, Peter. Duel of Eagles (new edition). London: Phoenix, 2000. ISBN 1-84212-211-8.
- Wellum, Geoffrey. First Light: The Story of the Boy Who Became a Man in the War-Torn Skies Above Britain. New York: Viking Books, 2002. ISBN 0-670-91248-4 (hardcover); Hoboken, NJ: Wiley & Sons, 2003. ISBN 0-471-42627-X (hardcover); London: Penguin Books, 2003. ISBN 0-14-100814-8 (paperback).
- Zaloga, Steven J.; Hook, Richard (1982). The Polish Army 1939–45. London: Osprey. ISBN 978-0-85045-417-8..
